= List of mammals of Equatorial Guinea =

This is a list of the mammal species recorded in Equatorial Guinea. Of the mammal species in Equatorial Guinea, one is critically endangered, eight are endangered, nine are vulnerable, and four are near threatened.

The following tags are used to highlight each species' conservation status as assessed by the International Union for Conservation of Nature:

EX	Extinct	No reasonable doubt that the last individual has died.
EW	Extinct in the wild	Known only to survive in captivity or as a naturalized populations well outside its previous range.
CR	Critically endangered	The species is in imminent risk of extinction in the wild.
EN	Endangered	The species is facing an extremely high risk of extinction in the wild.
VU	Vulnerable	The species is facing a high risk of extinction in the wild.
NT	Near threatened	The species does not meet any of the criteria that would categorise it as risking extinction but it is likely to do so in the future.
LC	Least concern	There are no current identifiable risks to the species.
DD	Data deficient	There is inadequate information to make an assessment of the risks to this species.

Some species were assessed using an earlier set of criteria. Species assessed using this system have the following instead of near threatened and least concern categories:

LR/cd	Lower risk/conservation dependent	Species which were the focus of conservation programmes and may have moved into a higher risk category if that programme was discontinued.
LR/nt	Lower risk/near threatened	Species which are close to being classified as vulnerable but are not the subject of conservation programmes.
LR/lc	Lower risk/least concern	Species for which there are no identifiable risks.

== Order: Hyracoidea (hyraxes) ==
The hyraxes are any of four species of fairly small, thickset, herbivorous mammals in the order Hyracoidea. About the size of a domestic cat they are well-furred, with rounded bodies and a stumpy tail. They are native to Africa and the Middle East.

- Family: Procaviidae (hyraxes)
  - Genus: Dendrohyrax
    - Western tree hyrax, Dendrohyrax dorsalis LC

== Order: Proboscidea (elephants) ==
The elephants comprise three living species and are the largest living land animals.

- Family: Elephantidae (elephants)
  - Genus: Loxodonta
    - African forest elephant, L. cyclotis CR

== Order: Sirenia (manatees and dugongs) ==
Sirenia is an order of fully aquatic, herbivorous mammals that inhabit rivers, estuaries, coastal marine waters, swamps, and marine wetlands. All four species are endangered.

- Family: Trichechidae
  - Genus: Trichechus
    - African manatee, Trichechus senegalensis VU

== Order: Primates ==
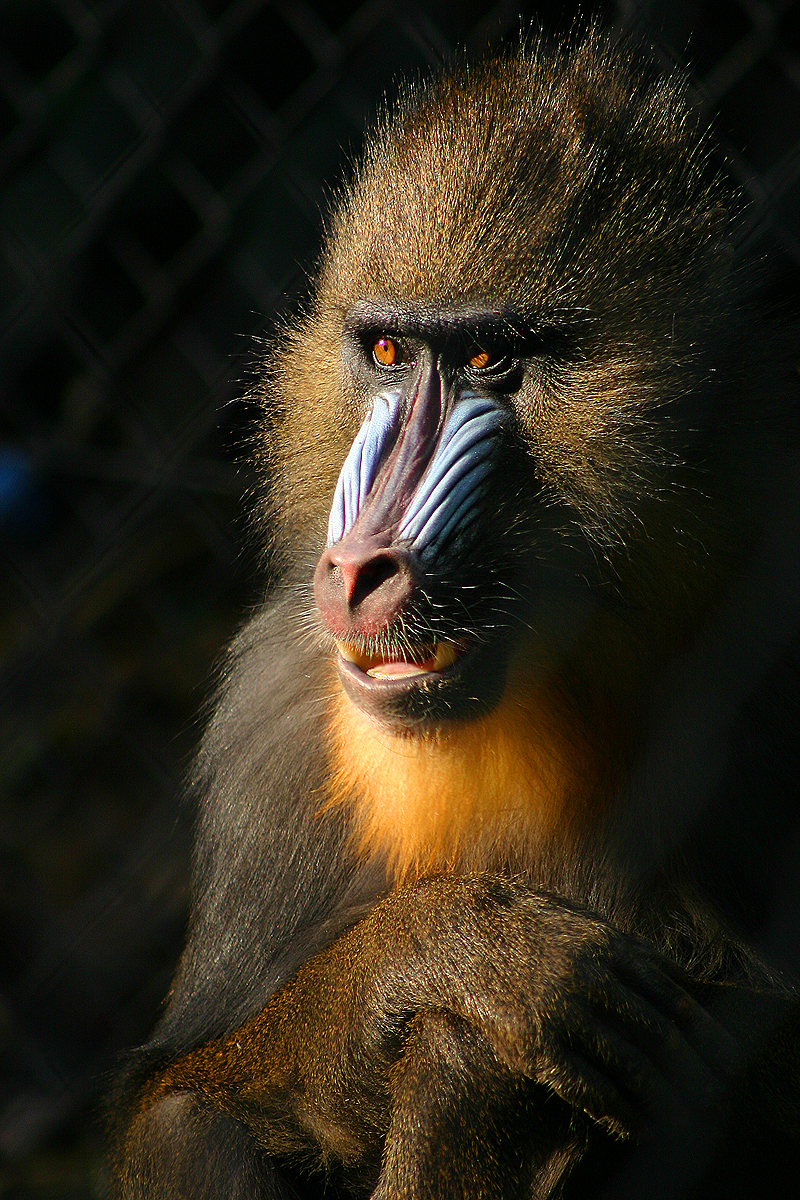
Mandrill

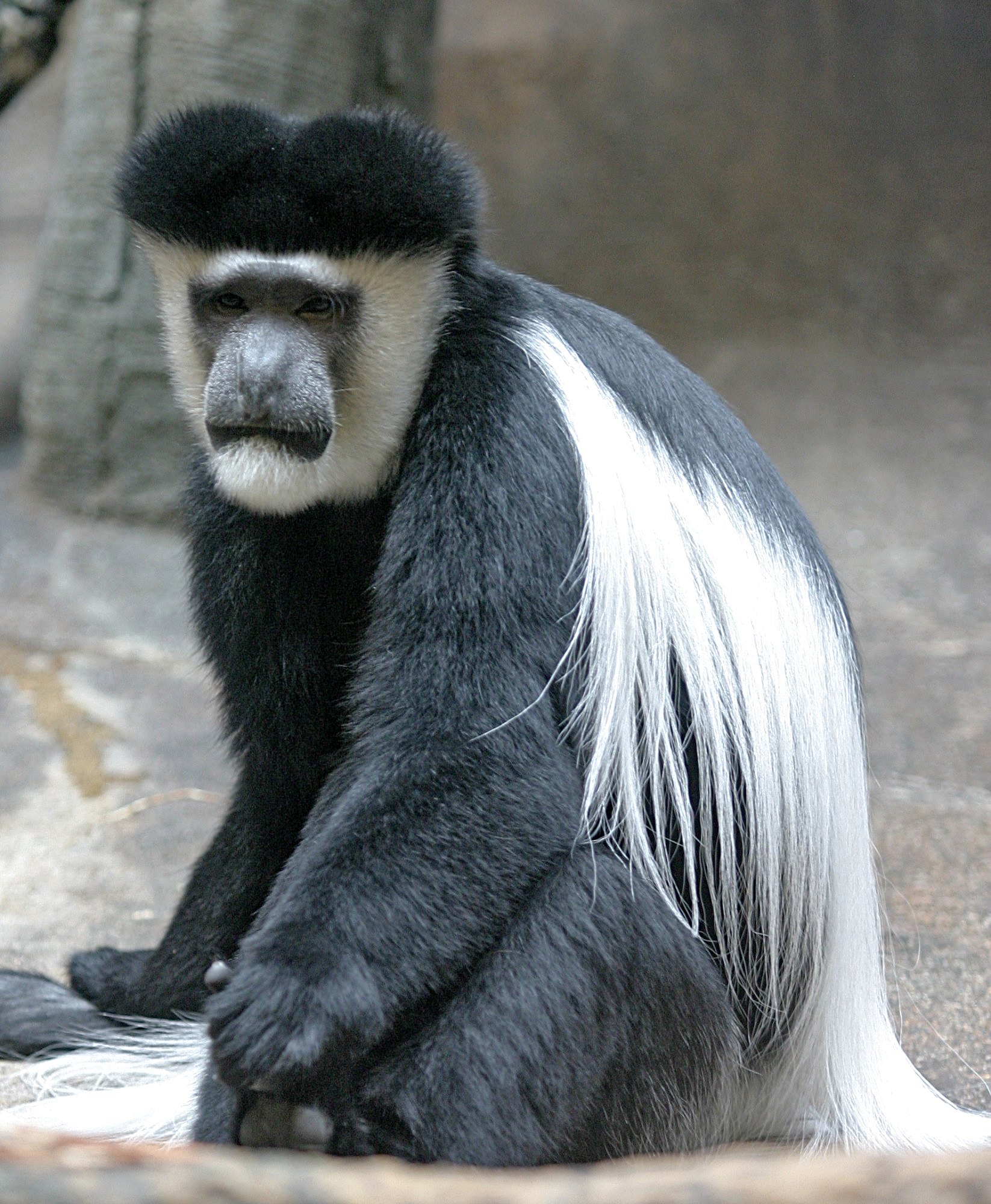
Mantled guereza

The order Primates contains humans and their closest relatives: lemurs, lorisoids, tarsiers, monkeys, and apes.

- Suborder: Strepsirrhini
  - Infraorder: Lemuriformes
    - Superfamily: Lorisoidea
      - Family: Lorisidae
        - Genus: Arctocebus
          - Golden angwantibo, Arctocebus aureus LR/nt
        - Genus: Perodicticus
          - Potto, Perodicticus potto LR/lc
      - Family: Galagidae
        - Genus: Sciurocheirus
          - Bioko Allen's bushbaby, Sciurocheirus alleni LR/nt
        - Genus: Galagoides
          - Thomas's bushbaby, Galagoides thomasi LR/lc
          - Prince Demidoff's bushbaby, Galagoides demidovii LR/lc
        - Genus: Euoticus
          - Southern needle-clawed bushbaby, Euoticus elegantulus LR/nt
          - Northern needle-clawed bushbaby, Euoticus pallidus LR/nt
- Suborder: Haplorhini
  - Infraorder: Simiiformes
    - Parvorder: Catarrhini
      - Superfamily: Cercopithecoidea
        - Family: Cercopithecidae (Old World monkeys)
          - Genus: Miopithecus
            - Gabon talapoin, Miopithecus ogouensis LR/lc
          - Genus: Cercopithecus
            - Moustached guenon, Cercopithecus cephus LR/lc
            - Red-eared guenon, Cercopithecus erythrotis VU
            - De Brazza's monkey, Cercopithecus neglectus LR/lc
            - Greater spot-nosed monkey, Cercopithecus nictitans LR/lc
            - Crowned guenon, Cercopithecus pogonias LR/lc
            - Preuss's monkey, Cercopithecus preussi EN
          - Genus: Lophocebus
            - Grey-cheeked mangabey, Lophocebus albigena LR/lc
          - Genus: Cercocebus
            - Collared mangabey, Cercocebus torquatus LR/nt
          - Genus: Mandrillus
            - Drill, Mandrillus leucophaeus EN
            - Mandrill, Mandrillus sphinx VU
          - Subfamily: Colobinae
            - Genus: Colobus
              - Mantled guereza, Colobus guereza LR/lc
              - Black colobus, Colobus satanas VU
            - Genus: Procolobus
              - Red colobus, Procolobus badius EN
              - Pennant's colobus, Procolobus pennantii EN
      - Superfamily: Hominoidea
        - Family: Hominidae (great apes)
          - Subfamily: Homininae
            - Tribe: Gorillini
              - Genus: Gorilla
                - Western gorilla, Gorilla gorilla EN
            - Tribe: Panini
              - Genus: Pan
                - Common chimpanzee, Pan troglodytes EN

== Order: Rodentia (rodents) ==
Rodents make up the largest order of mammals, with over 40% of mammalian species. They have two incisors in the upper and lower jaw which grow continually and must be kept short by gnawing. Most rodents are small though the capybara can weigh up to 45 kg (99 lb).

- Suborder: Hystricognathi
  - Family: Hystricidae (Old World porcupines)
    - Genus: Atherurus
      - African brush-tailed porcupine, Atherurus africanus LC
  - Family: Thryonomyidae (cane rats)
    - Genus: Thryonomys
      - Greater cane rat, Thryonomys swinderianus LC
- Suborder: Sciurognathi
  - Family: Anomaluridae
    - Subfamily: Anomalurinae
      - Genus: Anomalurus
        - Lord Derby's scaly-tailed squirrel, Anomalurus derbianus LC
        - Dwarf scaly-tailed squirrel, Anomalurus pusillus LC
      - Genus: Anomalurops
        - Beecroft's scaly-tailed squirrel, Anomalurops beecrofti LC
    - Subfamily: Zenkerellinae
      - Genus: Idiurus
        - Long-eared flying mouse, Idiurus macrotis LC
        - Flying mouse, Idiurus zenkeri DD
  - Family: Sciuridae (squirrels)
    - Subfamily: Xerinae
      - Tribe: Protoxerini
        - Genus: Epixerus
          - Baifran palm squirrel, Epixerus wilsoni DD
        - Genus: Funisciurus
          - Thomas's rope squirrel, Funisciurus anerythrus DD
          - Lady Burton's rope squirrel, Funisciurus isabella LC
          - Ribboned rope squirrel, Funisciurus lemniscatus DD
          - Red-cheeked rope squirrel, Funisciurus leucogenys DD
          - Fire-footed rope squirrel, Funisciurus pyrropus LC
        - Genus: Heliosciurus
          - Red-legged sun squirrel, Heliosciurus rufobrachium LC
        - Genus: Myosciurus
          - African pygmy squirrel, Myosciurus pumilio DD
        - Genus: Paraxerus
          - Green bush squirrel, Paraxerus poensis LC
        - Genus: Protoxerus
          - Forest giant squirrel, Protoxerus stangeri LC
  - Family: Gliridae (dormice)
    - Subfamily: Graphiurinae
      - Genus: Graphiurus
        - Jentink's dormouse, Graphiurus crassicaudatus DD
        - Silent dormouse, Graphiurus surdus DD
  - Family: Nesomyidae
    - Subfamily: Cricetomyinae
      - Genus: Cricetomys
        - Emin's pouched rat, Cricetomys emini LC
  - Family: Muridae (mice, rats, voles, gerbils, hamsters, etc.)
    - Subfamily: Deomyinae
      - Genus: Deomys
        - Link rat, Deomys ferrugineus LC
      - Genus: Lophuromys
        - Fire-bellied brush-furred rat, Lophuromys nudicaudus LC
        - Rusty-bellied brush-furred rat, Lophuromys sikapusi LC
    - Subfamily: Murinae
      - Genus: Colomys
        - African wading rat, Colomys goslingi LC
      - Genus: Grammomys
        - Shining thicket rat, Grammomys rutilans LC
      - Genus: Heimyscus
        - African smoky mouse, Heimyscus fumosus LC
      - Genus: Hybomys
        - Father Basilio's striped mouse, Hybomys basilii EN
        - Peters's striped mouse, Hybomys univittatus LC
      - Genus: Hylomyscus
        - Beaded wood mouse, Hylomyscus aeta LC
        - Allen's wood mouse, Hylomyscus alleni LC
        - Little wood mouse, Hylomyscus parvus LC
        - Stella wood mouse, Hylomyscus stella LC
      - Genus: Malacomys
        - Big-eared swamp rat, Malacomys longipes LC
      - Genus: Mastomys
        - Natal multimammate mouse, Mastomys natalensis LC
      - Genus: Mus
        - African pygmy mouse, Mus minutoides LC
        - Peters's mouse, Mus setulosus LC
      - Genus: Oenomys
        - Common rufous-nosed rat, Oenomys hypoxanthus LC
      - Genus: Praomys
        - Jackson's soft-furred mouse, Praomys jacksoni LC
        - Cameroon soft-furred mouse, Praomys morio VU
        - Tullberg's soft-furred mouse, Praomys tullbergi LC
      - Genus: Stochomys
        - Target rat, Stochomys longicaudatus LC

== Order: Soricomorpha (shrews, moles, and solenodons) ==
The "shrew-forms" are insectivorous mammals. The shrews and solenodons closely resemble mice while the moles are stout-bodied burrowers.

- Family: Soricidae (shrews)
  - Subfamily: Crocidurinae
    - Genus: Crocidura
      - Bates's shrew, Crocidura batesi LC
      - Long-footed shrew, Crocidura crenata LC
      - Dent's shrew, Crocidura denti LC
      - Goliath shrew, Crocidura goliath LC
      - Fraser's musk shrew, Crocidura poensis LC
      - Turbo shrew, Crocidura turba LC
    - Genus: Paracrocidura
      - Lesser large-headed shrew, Paracrocidura schoutedeni LC
    - Genus: Sylvisorex
      - Bioko forest shrew, Sylvisorex isabellae EN
      - Johnston's forest shrew, Sylvisorex johnstoni LC
      - Greater forest shrew, Sylvisorex ollula LC
  - Subfamily: Myosoricinae
    - Genus: Myosorex
      - Eisentraut's mouse shrew, Myosorex eisentrauti CR

== Order: Chiroptera (bats) ==
The bats' most distinguishing feature is that their forelimbs are developed as wings, making them the only mammals capable of flight. Bat species account for about 20% of all mammals.

- Family: Pteropodidae (flying foxes, Old World fruit bats)
  - Subfamily: Pteropodinae
    - Genus: Eidolon
      - Straw-coloured fruit bat, Eidolon helvum LC
    - Genus: Epomophorus
      - Wahlberg's epauletted fruit bat, Epomophorus wahlbergi LC
    - Genus: Epomops
      - Franquet's epauletted fruit bat, Epomops franqueti LC
    - Genus: Hypsignathus
      - Hammer-headed bat, Hypsignathus monstrosus LC
    - Genus: Micropteropus
      - Peters's dwarf epauletted fruit bat, Micropteropus pusillus LC
    - Genus: Myonycteris
      - Little collared fruit bat, Myonycteris torquata LC
    - Genus: Rousettus
      - Egyptian fruit bat, Rousettus aegyptiacus LC
    - Genus: Scotonycteris
      - Zenker's fruit bat, Scotonycteris zenkeri NT
  - Subfamily: Macroglossinae
    - Genus: Megaloglossus
      - Woermann's bat, Megaloglossus woermanni LC
- Family: Vespertilionidae
  - Subfamily: Myotinae
    - Genus: Myotis
      - Rufous mouse-eared bat, Myotis bocagii LC
  - Subfamily: Vespertilioninae
    - Genus: Eptesicus
      - Lagos serotine, Eptesicus platyops DD
    - Genus: Glauconycteris
      - Silvered bat, Glauconycteris argentata LC
      - Beatrix's bat, Glauconycteris beatrix NT
      - Abo bat, Glauconycteris poensis LC
    - Genus: Mimetillus
      - Moloney's mimic bat, Mimetillus moloneyi LC
    - Genus: Neoromicia
      - Dark-brown serotine, Neoromicia brunneus NT
      - Cape serotine, Neoromicia capensis LC
      - Banana pipistrelle, Neoromicia nanus LC
      - White-winged serotine, Neoromicia tenuipinnis LC
    - Genus: Pipistrellus
      - Tiny pipistrelle, Pipistrellus nanulus LC
    - Genus: Scotophilus
      - Nut-colored yellow bat, Scotophilus nux LC
  - Subfamily: Miniopterinae
    - Genus: Miniopterus
      - Greater long-fingered bat, Miniopterus inflatus LC
- Family: Molossidae
  - Genus: Chaerephon
    - Little free-tailed bat, Chaerephon pumila LC
  - Genus: Mops
    - Sierra Leone free-tailed bat, Mops brachypterus LC
    - Spurrell's free-tailed bat, Mops spurrelli LC
    - Railer bat, Mops thersites LC
- Family: Emballonuridae
  - Genus: Saccolaimus
    - Pel's pouched bat, Saccolaimus peli NT
  - Genus: Taphozous
    - Mauritian tomb bat, Taphozous mauritianus LC
- Family: Nycteridae
  - Genus: Nycteris
    - Bate's slit-faced bat, Nycteris arge LC
    - Large slit-faced bat, Nycteris grandis LC
    - Hairy slit-faced bat, Nycteris hispida LC
    - Large-eared slit-faced bat, Nycteris macrotis LC
    - Dwarf slit-faced bat, Nycteris nana LC
- Family: Rhinolophidae
  - Subfamily: Rhinolophinae
    - Genus: Rhinolophus
      - Halcyon horseshoe bat, Rhinolophus alcyone LC
      - Lander's horseshoe bat, Rhinolophus landeri LC
  - Subfamily: Hipposiderinae
    - Genus: Hipposideros
      - Benito roundleaf bat, Hipposideros beatus LC
      - Sundevall's roundleaf bat, Hipposideros caffer LC
      - Short-tailed roundleaf bat, Hipposideros curtus VU
      - Cyclops roundleaf bat, Hipposideros cyclops LC
      - Giant roundleaf bat, Hipposideros gigas LC
      - Noack's roundleaf bat, Hipposideros ruber LC

== Order: Pholidota (pangolins) ==
The order Pholidota comprises the eight species of pangolin. Pangolins are anteaters and have the powerful claws, elongated snout and long tongue seen in the other unrelated anteater species.

- Family: Manidae
  - Genus: Manis
    - Giant pangolin, Manis gigantea LR/lc
    - Long-tailed pangolin, Manis tetradactyla LR/lc
    - Tree pangolin, Manis tricuspis LR/lc

== Order: Cetacea (whales) ==
The order Cetacea includes whales, dolphins and porpoises. They are the mammals most fully adapted to aquatic life with a spindle-shaped nearly hairless body, protected by a thick layer of blubber, and forelimbs and tail modified to provide propulsion underwater.

- Suborder: Mysticeti
  - Family: Balaenopteridae
    - Subfamily: Balaenopterinae
      - Genus: Balaenoptera
        - Common minke whale, Balaenoptera acutorostrata LC
        - Antarctic minke whale, Balaenoptera bonaerensis DD
        - Sei whale, Balaenoptera borealis EN
        - Bryde's whale, Balaenoptera edeni DD
        - Blue whale, Balaenoptera musculus EN
        - Fin whale, Balaenoptera physalus EN
    - Subfamily: Megapterinae
      - Genus: Megaptera
        - Humpback whale, Megaptera novaeangliae VU
- Suborder: Odontoceti
  - Superfamily: Platanistoidea
    - Family: Physeteridae
      - Genus: Physeter
        - Sperm whale, Physeter macrocephalus VU
    - Family: Kogiidae
      - Genus: Kogia
        - Pygmy sperm whale, Kogia breviceps LR/lc
        - Dwarf sperm whale, Kogia sima LR/lc
    - Family: Ziphidae
      - Subfamily: Hyperoodontinae
        - Genus: Mesoplodon
          - Blainville's beaked whale, Mesoplodon densirostris DD
          - Gervais' beaked whale, Mesoplodon europaeus DD
        - Genus: Ziphius
          - Cuvier's beaked whale, Ziphius cavirostris DD
    - Family: Delphinidae (marine dolphins)
      - Genus: Steno
        - Rough-toothed dolphin, Steno bredanensis DD
      - Genus: Tursiops
        - Common bottlenose dolphin, Tursiops truncatus LC
      - Genus: Delphinus
        - Long-beaked common dolphin, Delphinus capensis DD
      - Genus: Stenella
        - Pantropical spotted dolphin, Stenella attenuata LR/cd
        - Striped dolphin, Stenella coeruleoalba LR/cd
        - Atlantic spotted dolphin, Stenella frontalis DD
        - Clymene dolphin, Stenella clymene DD
        - Spinner dolphin, Stenella longirostris LR/cd
      - Genus: Lagenodelphis
        - Fraser's dolphin, Lagenodelphis hosei DD
      - Genus: Sousa
        - Atlantic humpback dolphin, Sousa teuszii
      - Genus: Orcinus
        - Orca, Orcinus orca LR/cd
      - Genus: Feresa
        - Pygmy killer whale, Feresa attenuata DD
      - Genus: Pseudorca
        - False killer whale, Pseudorca crassidens LR/lc
      - Genus: Globicephala
        - Short-finned pilot whale, Globicephala macrorhynchus LR/cd
      - Genus: Peponocephala
        - Melon-headed whale, Peponocephala electra DD

== Order: Carnivora (carnivorans) ==
There are over 260 species of carnivorans, the majority of which feed primarily on meat. They have a characteristic skull shape and dentition.

- Suborder: Feliformia
  - Family: Felidae (cats)
    - Subfamily: Felinae
      - Genus: Caracal
        - African golden cat, C. aurata VU
    - Subfamily: Pantherinae
      - Genus: Panthera
        - Leopard, Panthera pardus LC
  - Family: Viverridae (civets, mongooses, etc.)
    - Subfamily: Viverrinae
      - Genus: Civettictis
        - African civet, Civettictis civetta LR/lc
      - Genus: Genetta
        - Rusty-spotted genet, Genetta maculata LR/lc
        - Servaline genet, Genetta servalina LR/lc
      - Genus: Poiana
        - Central African oyan, Poiana richardsonii LR/lc
  - Family: Nandiniidae
    - Genus: Nandinia
      - African palm civet, Nandinia binotata LR/lc
  - Family: Herpestidae (mongooses)
    - Genus: Atilax
      - Marsh mongoose, Atilax paludinosus LR/lc
    - Genus: Bdeogale
      - Black-footed mongoose, Bdeogale nigripes LR/lc
    - Genus: Herpestes
      - Common slender mongoose, Herpestes sanguineus LR/lc
    - Genus: Xenogale
      - Long-nosed mongoose, Xenogale naso LR/lc
  - Family: Hyaenidae (hyaenas)
    - Genus: Crocuta
      - Spotted hyena, Crocuta crocuta LR/cd
- Suborder: Caniformia
  - Family: Mustelidae (mustelids)
    - Genus: Ictonyx
      - Striped polecat, Ictonyx striatus LR/lc
    - Genus: Mellivora
      - Honey badger, Mellivora capensis LR/lc
    - Genus: Hydrictis
      - Speckle-throated otter, H. maculicollis LC
    - Genus: Aonyx
      - African small-clawed otter, Aonyx congicus NT

== Order: Artiodactyla (even-toed ungulates) ==
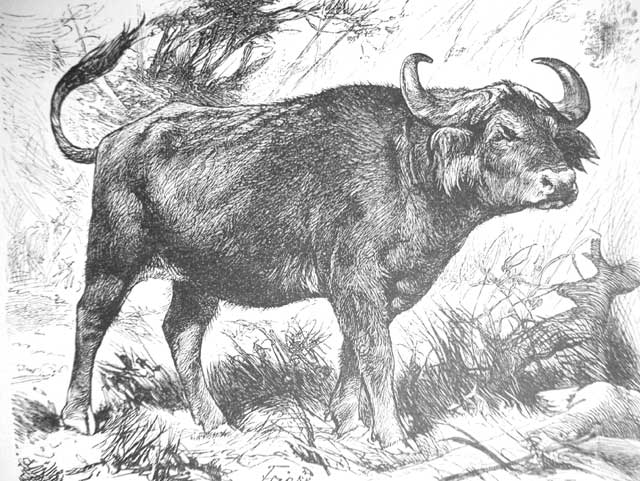
African buffalo

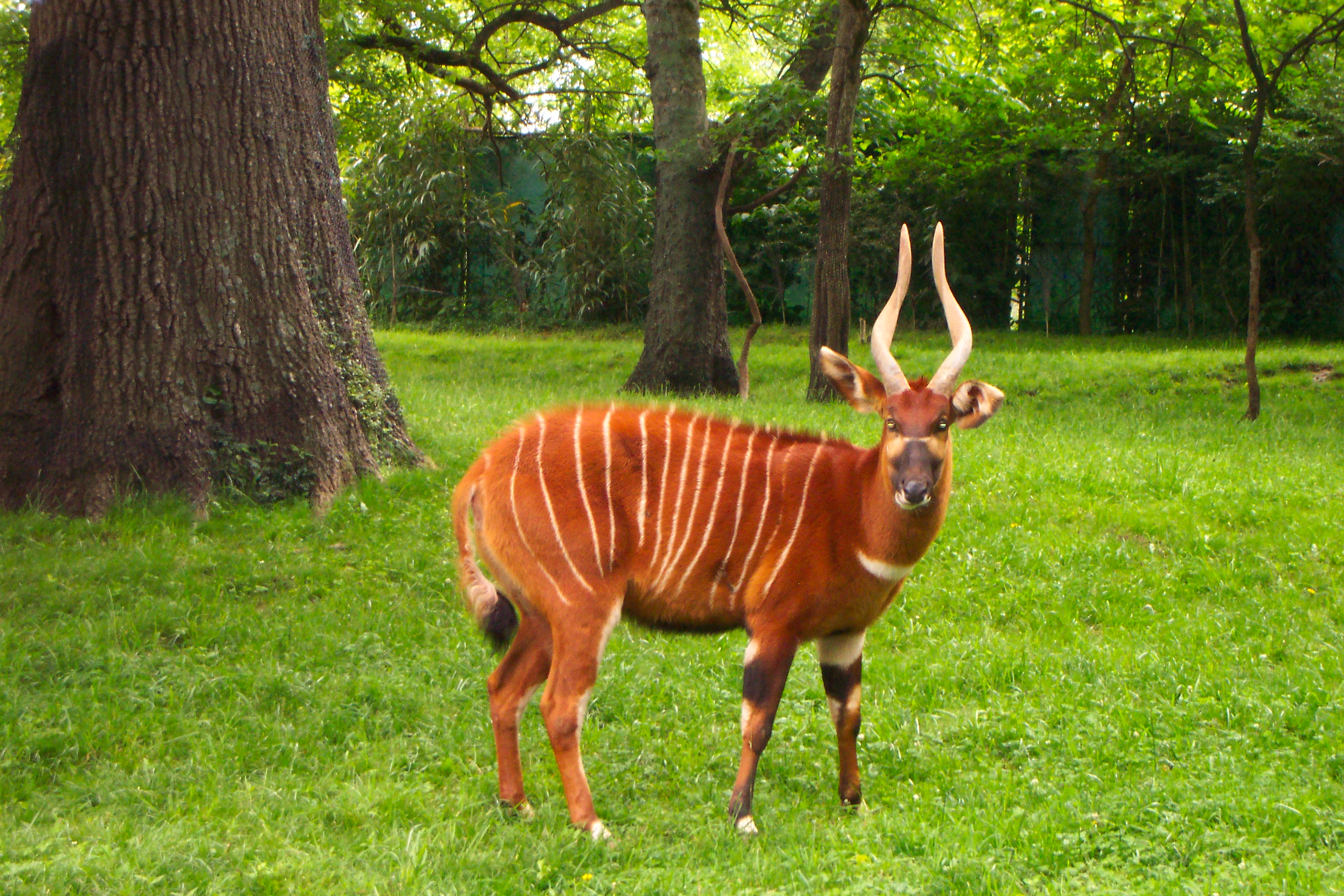
Bongo

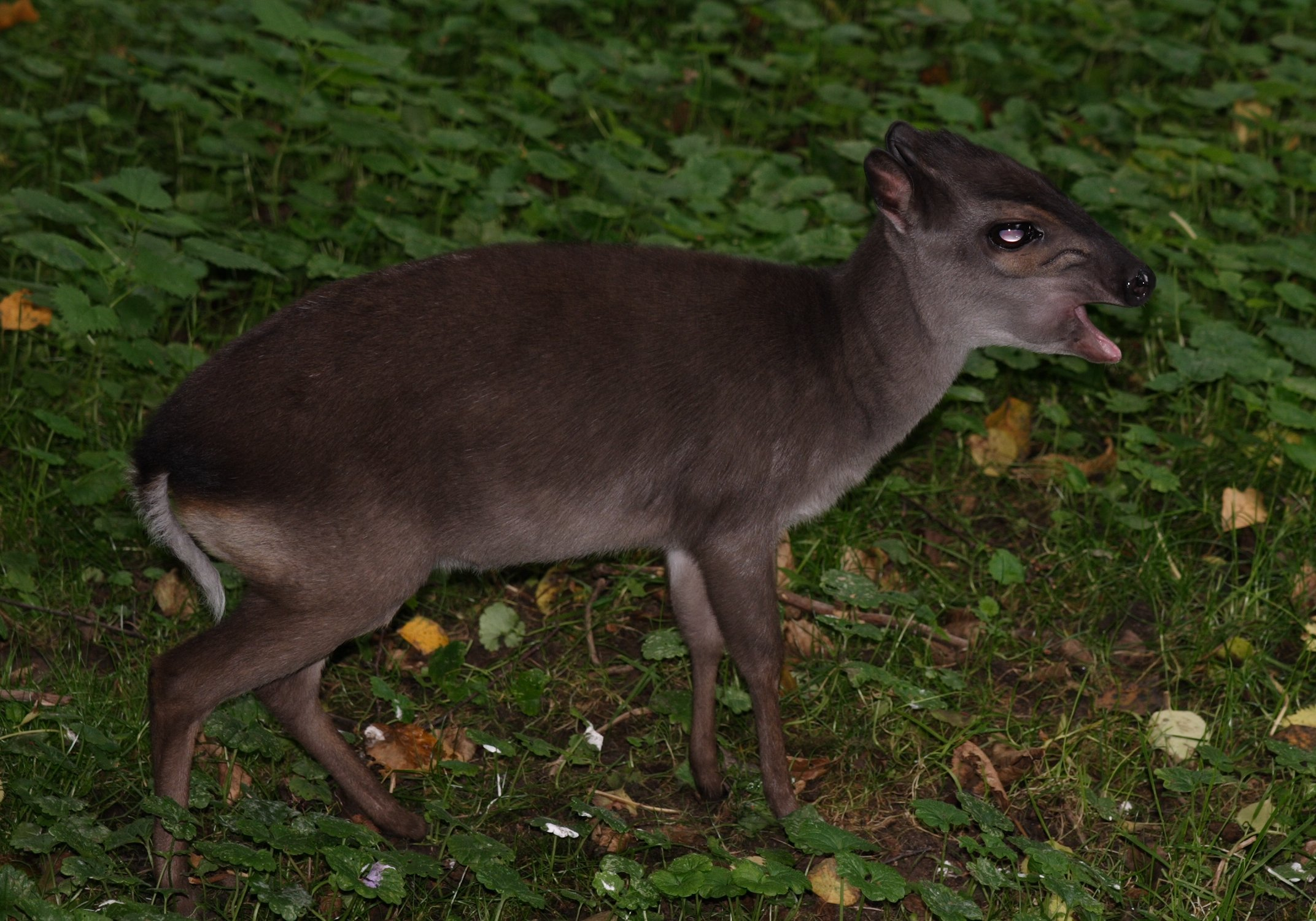
Blue duiker

The even-toed ungulates are ungulates whose weight is borne about equally by the third and fourth toes, rather than mostly or entirely by the third as in perissodactyls. There are about 220 artiodactyl species, including many that are of great economic importance to humans.

- Family: Suidae (pigs)
  - Subfamily: Suinae
    - Genus: Potamochoerus
      - Red river hog, Potamochoerus porcus LR/lc
- Family: Hippopotamidae (hippopotamuses)
  - Genus: Hippopotamus
    - Hippopotamus, Hippopotamus amphibius VU
- Family: Tragulidae
  - Genus: Hyemoschus
    - Water chevrotain, Hyemoschus aquaticus DD
- Family: Bovidae (cattle, antelope, sheep, goats)
  - Subfamily: Antilopinae
    - Genus: Neotragus
      - Bates's pygmy antelope, Neotragus batesi LR/nt
  - Subfamily: Bovinae
    - Genus: Syncerus
      - African buffalo, Syncerus caffer LR/cd
    - Genus: Tragelaphus
      - Bongo, Tragelaphus eurycerus LR/nt
      - Bushbuck, Tragelaphus scriptus LR/lc
      - Sitatunga, Tragelaphus spekii LR/nt
  - Subfamily: Cephalophinae
    - Genus: Cephalophus
      - Peters's duiker, Cephalophus callipygus LR/nt
      - Bay duiker, Cephalophus dorsalis LR/nt
      - White-bellied duiker, Cephalophus leucogaster LR/nt
      - Blue duiker, Cephalophus monticola LR/lc
      - Black-fronted duiker, Cephalophus nigrifrons LR/nt
      - Ogilby's duiker, Cephalophus ogilbyi LR/nt
      - Yellow-backed duiker, Cephalophus silvicultor LR/nt

== See also ==
- List of chordate orders
- Lists of mammals by region
- List of prehistoric mammals
- Mammal classification
- List of mammals described in the 2000s
