= List of mammals of the Central African Republic =

This is a list of the mammal species recorded in the Central African Republic. There are 224 mammal species in the Central African Republic, of which four are endangered, eight are vulnerable, and nine are near threatened.

The following tags are used to highlight each species' conservation status as assessed by the International Union for Conservation of Nature:

EX	Extinct	No reasonable doubt that the last individual has died.
EW	Extinct in the wild	Known only to survive in captivity or as a naturalized populations well outside its previous range.
CR	Critically endangered	The species is in imminent risk of extinction in the wild.
EN	Endangered	The species is facing an extremely high risk of extinction in the wild.
VU	Vulnerable	The species is facing a high risk of extinction in the wild.
NT	Near threatened	The species does not meet any of the criteria that would categorise it as risking extinction but it is likely to do so in the future.
LC	Least concern	There are no current identifiable risks to the species.
DD	Data deficient	There is inadequate information to make an assessment of the risks to this species.

Some species were assessed using an earlier set of criteria. Species assessed using this system have the following instead of near threatened and least concern categories:

LR/cd	Lower risk/conservation dependent	Species which were the focus of conservation programmes and may have moved into a higher risk category if that programme was discontinued.
LR/nt	Lower risk/near threatened	Species which are close to being classified as vulnerable but are not the subject of conservation programmes.
LR/lc	Lower risk/least concern	Species for which there are no identifiable risks.

== Order: Tubulidentata (aardvarks) ==
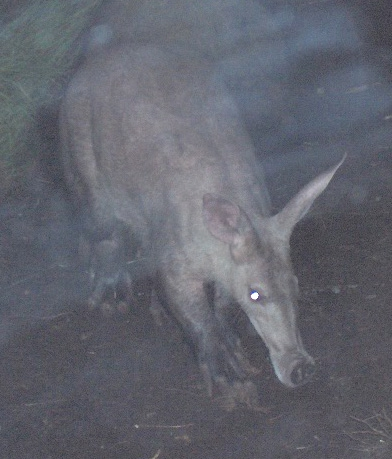
Aardvark

The order Tubulidentata consists of a single species, the aardvark. Tubulidentata are characterised by their teeth which lack a pulp cavity and form thin tubes which are continuously worn down and replaced.

- Family: Orycteropodidae
  - Genus: Orycteropus
    - Aardvark, Orycteropus afer LC

== Order: Afrosoricida (tenrecs and golden moles) ==
The order Afrosoricida contains the golden moles of southern Africa and the tenrecs of Madagascar and Africa, two families of small mammals that were traditionally part of the order Insectivora.

- Family: Tenrecidae (tenrecs)
  - Subfamily: Potamogalinae
    - Genus: Potamogale
      - Giant otter shrew, Potamogale velox LC
- Family: Chrysochloridae
  - Subfamily: Amblysominae
    - Genus: Calcochloris
      - Congo golden mole, Calcochloris leucorhinus DD

== Order: Macroscelidea (elephant shrews) ==
Often called sengi, the elephant shrews or jumping shrews are native to southern Africa. Their common English name derives from their elongated flexible snout and their resemblance to the true shrews.

- Family: Macroscelididae (elephant shrews)
  - Genus: Rhynchocyon
    - Checkered elephant shrew, R. cirnei LC

== Order: Hyracoidea (hyraxes) ==
The hyraxes are any of four species of fairly small, thickset, herbivorous mammals in the order Hyracoidea. About the size of a domestic cat they are well-furred, with rounded bodies and a stumpy tail. They are native to Africa and the Middle East.

- Family: Procaviidae (hyraxes)
  - Genus: Dendrohyrax
    - Western tree hyrax, Dendrohyrax dorsalis LC

== Order: Proboscidea (elephants) ==
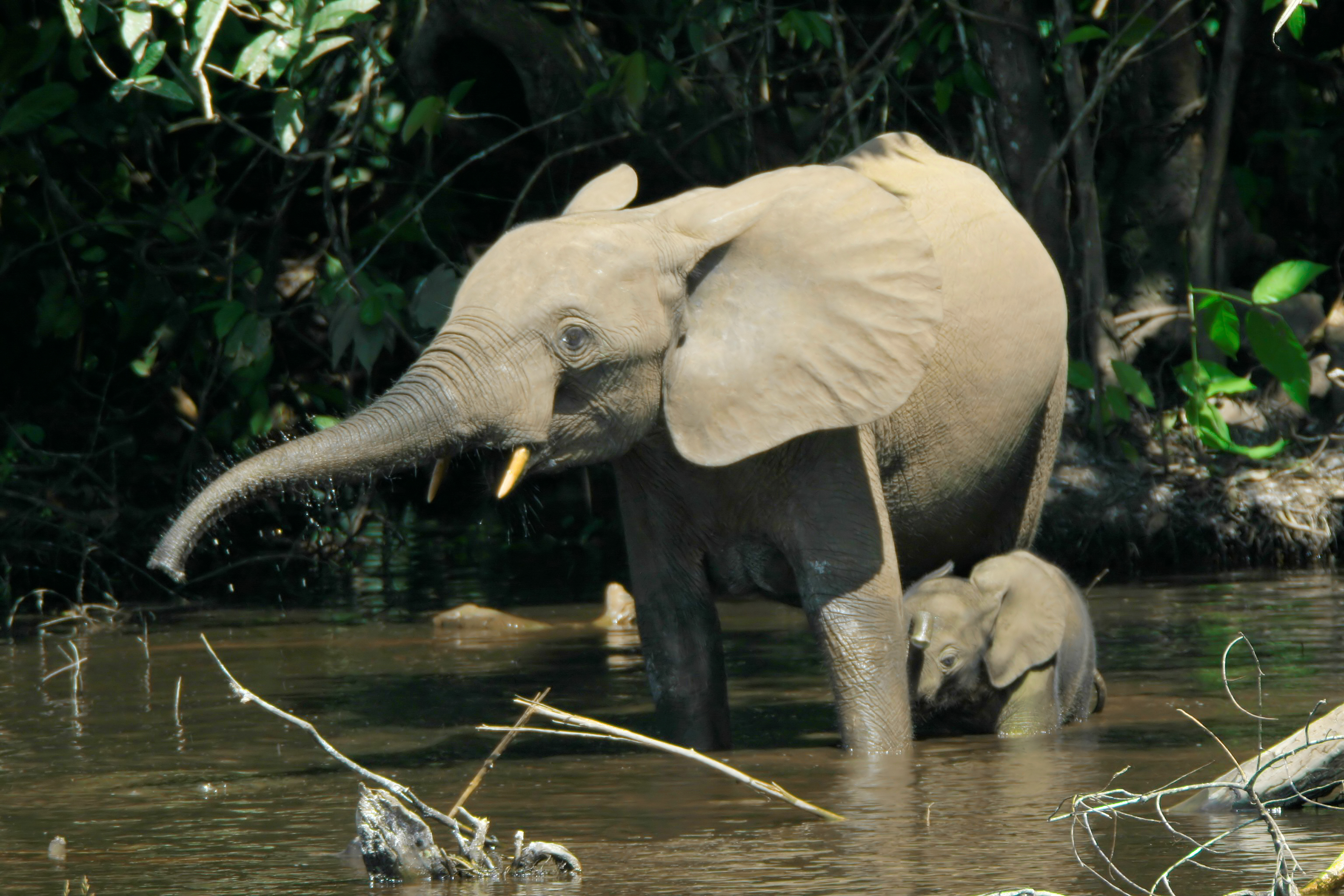
African forest elephant in the Congo Basin

The elephants comprise three living species and are the largest living terrestrial animals.

- Family: Elephantidae
  - Genus: Loxodonta
    - African bush elephant, L. africana EN
    - African forest elephant, L. cyclotis CR

== Order: Primates ==
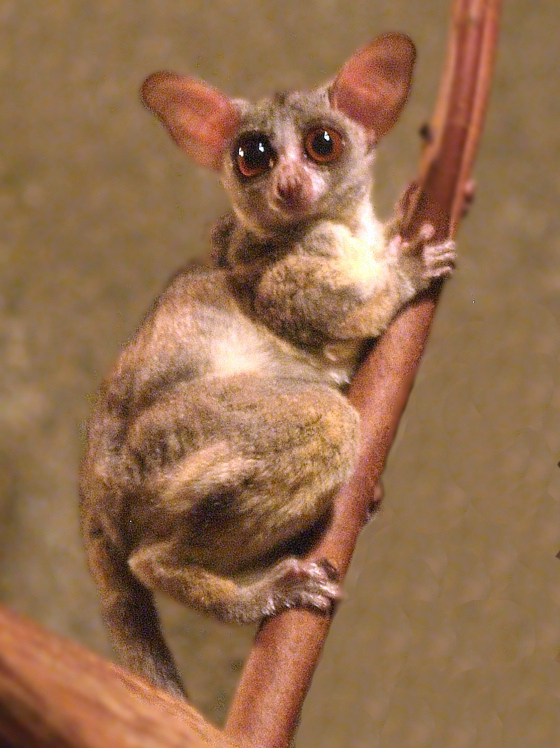
Senegal bushbaby

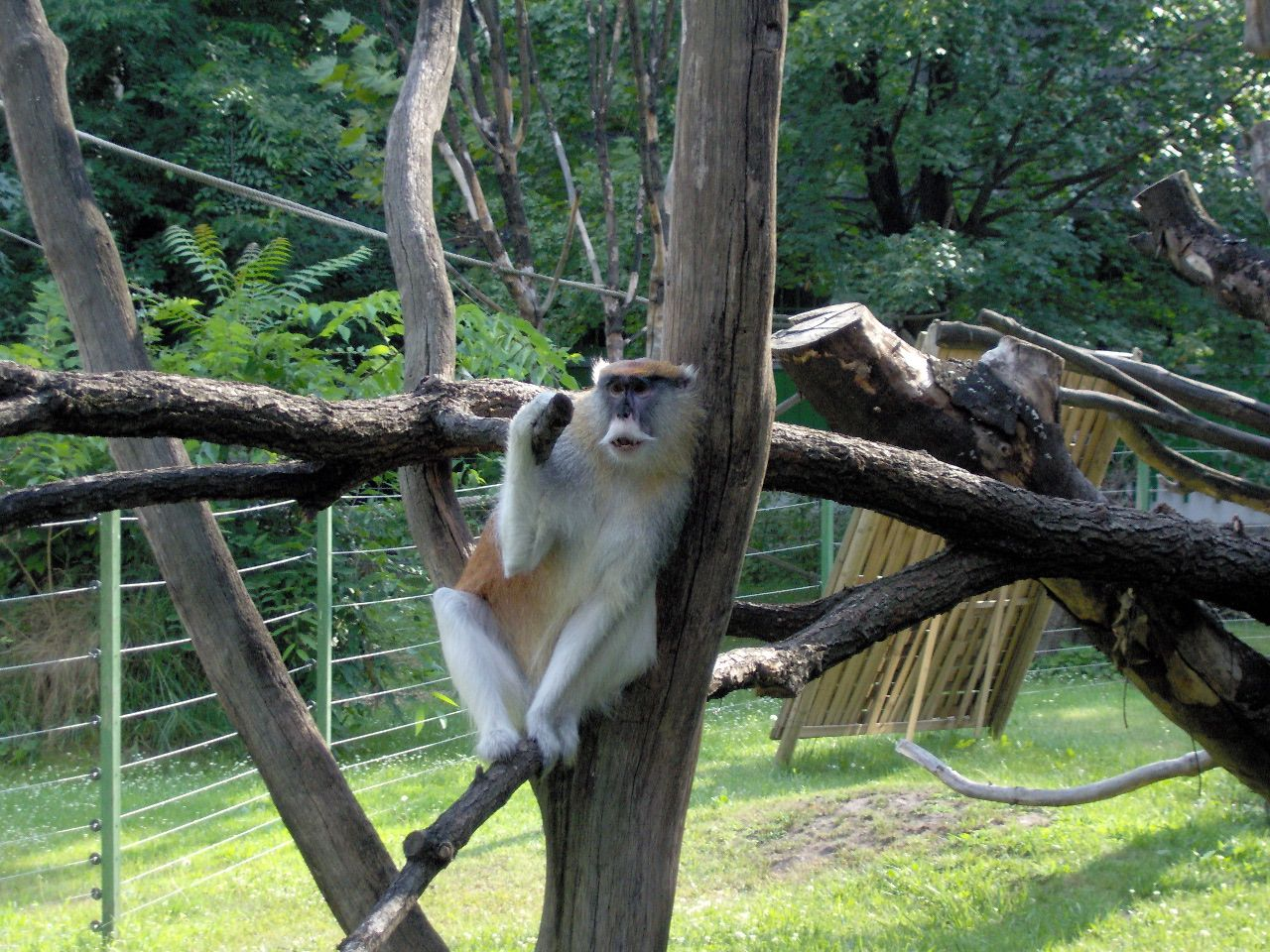
Patas monkey

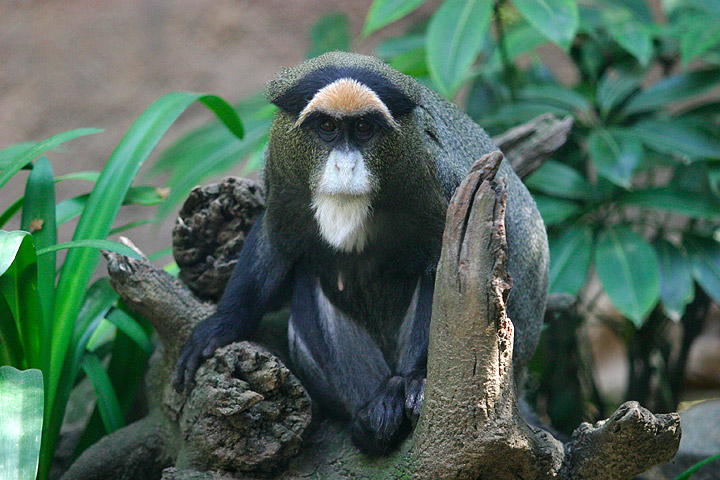
De Brazza's monkey

The order Primates contains humans and their closest relatives: lemurs, lorisoids, tarsiers, monkeys, and apes.

- Suborder: Strepsirrhini
  - Infraorder: Lemuriformes
    - Superfamily: Lorisoidea
      - Family: Lorisidae (lorises, bushbabies)
        - Genus: Arctocebus
          - Golden angwantibo, Arctocebus aureus LR/nt
        - Genus: Perodicticus
          - Potto, Perodicticus potto LR/lc
      - Family: Galagidae
        - Genus: Sciurocheirus
          - Bioko Allen's bushbaby, Sciurocheirus alleni LR/nt
        - Genus: Galago
          - Senegal bushbaby, Galago senegalensis LR/lc
        - Genus: Galagoides
          - Prince Demidoff's bushbaby, Galagoides demidovii LR/lc
        - Genus: Euoticus
          - Southern needle-clawed bushbaby, Euoticus elegantulus LR/nt
- Suborder: Haplorhini
  - Infraorder: Simiiformes
    - Parvorder: Catarrhini
      - Superfamily: Cercopithecoidea
        - Family: Cercopithecidae (Old World monkeys)
          - Genus Allenopithecus
            - Allen's swamp monkey, Allenopithecus nigroviridis
          - Genus: Erythrocebus
            - Patas monkey, Erythrocebus patas LR/lc
          - Genus: Chlorocebus
            - Tantalus monkey, Chlorocebus tantalus LR/lc
          - Genus: Cercopithecus
            - Red-tailed monkey, Cercopithecus ascanius LR/lc
            - Moustached guenon, Cercopithecus cephus LR/lc
            - De Brazza's monkey, Cercopithecus neglectus LR/lc
            - Greater spot-nosed monkey, Cercopithecus nictitans LR/lc
            - Crowned guenon, Cercopithecus pogonias LR/lc
          - Genus: Lophocebus
            - Grey-cheeked mangabey, Lophocebus albigena LR/lc
          - Genus: Papio
            - Olive baboon, Papio anubis LR/lc
          - Subfamily: Colobinae
            - Genus: Colobus
              - Mantled guereza, Colobus guereza LR/lc
            - Genus: Procolobus
              - Red colobus, Procolobus badius EN
      - Superfamily: Hominoidea
        - Family: Hominidae (great apes)
          - Subfamily: Homininae
            - Tribe: Gorillini
              - Genus: Gorilla
                - Western gorilla, Gorilla gorilla EN
            - Tribe: Panini
              - Genus: Pan
                - Common chimpanzee, Pan troglodytes EN

== Order: Rodentia (rodents) ==
Rodents make up the largest order of mammals, with over 40% of mammalian species. They have two incisors in the upper and lower jaw which grow continually and must be kept short by gnawing. Most rodents are small though the capybara can weigh up to 45 kg (99 lb).

- Suborder: Hystricognathi
  - Family: Bathyergidae
    - Genus: Cryptomys
      - Ochre mole-rat, Cryptomys ochraceocinereus DD
  - Family: Hystricidae (Old World porcupines)
    - Genus: Hystrix
      - Crested porcupine, Hystrix cristata LC
- Suborder: Sciurognathi
  - Family: Anomaluridae
    - Subfamily: Anomalurinae
      - Genus: Anomalurus
        - Lord Derby's scaly-tailed squirrel, Anomalurus derbianus LC
        - Dwarf scaly-tailed squirrel, Anomalurus pusillus LC
    - Subfamily: Zenkerellinae
      - Genus: Idiurus
        - Flying mouse, Idiurus zenkeri DD
      - Genus: Zenkerella
        - Flightless scaly-tailed squirrel, Zenkerella insignis DD
  - Family: Sciuridae (squirrels)
    - Subfamily: Xerinae
      - Tribe: Xerini
        - Genus: Xerus
          - Striped ground squirrel, Xerus erythropus LC
      - Tribe: Protoxerini
        - Genus: Funisciurus
          - Thomas's rope squirrel, Funisciurus anerythrus DD
          - Lady Burton's rope squirrel, Funisciurus isabella LC
          - Red-cheeked rope squirrel, Funisciurus leucogenys DD
        - Genus: Heliosciurus
          - Gambian sun squirrel, Heliosciurus gambianus LC
          - Red-legged sun squirrel, Heliosciurus rufobrachium LC
        - Genus: Protoxerus
          - Forest giant squirrel, Protoxerus stangeri LC
  - Family: Gliridae (dormice)
    - Subfamily: Graphiurinae
      - Genus: Graphiurus
        - Nagtglas's African dormouse, Graphiurus nagtglasii LC
        - Kellen's dormouse, Graphiurus kelleni LC
  - Family: Nesomyidae
    - Subfamily: Dendromurinae
      - Genus: Prionomys
        - Dollman's tree mouse, Prionomys batesi DD
    - Subfamily: Cricetomyinae
      - Genus: Cricetomys
        - Emin's pouched rat, Cricetomys emini LC
        - Gambian pouched rat, Cricetomys gambianus LC
  - Family: Muridae (mice, rats, voles, gerbils, hamsters, etc.)
    - Subfamily: Deomyinae
      - Genus: Deomys
        - Link rat, Deomys ferrugineus LC
      - Genus: Lophuromys
        - Fire-bellied brush-furred rat, Lophuromys nudicaudus LC
        - Rusty-bellied brush-furred rat, Lophuromys sikapusi LC
      - Genus: Uranomys
        - Rudd's mouse, Uranomys ruddi LC
    - Subfamily: Gerbillinae
      - Genus: Tatera
        - Kemp's gerbil, Tatera kempi LC
        - Fringe-tailed gerbil, Tatera robusta LC
      - Genus: Taterillus
        - Congo gerbil, Taterillus congicus LC
        - Harrington's gerbil, Taterillus harringtoni LC
    - Subfamily: Murinae
      - Genus: Aethomys
        - Hinde's rock rat, Aethomys hindei LC
      - Genus: Arvicanthis
        - African grass rat, Arvicanthis niloticus LC
        - Guinean grass rat, Arvicanthis rufinus LC
      - Genus: Grammomys
        - Macmillan's thicket rat, Grammomys macmillani LC
        - Shining thicket rat, Grammomys rutilans LC
      - Genus: Heimyscus
        - African smoky mouse, Heimyscus fumosus LC
      - Genus: Hybomys
        - Peters's striped mouse, Hybomys univittatus LC
      - Genus: Hylomyscus
        - Beaded wood mouse, Hylomyscus aeta LC
        - Little wood mouse, Hylomyscus parvus LC
        - Stella wood mouse, Hylomyscus stella LC
      - Genus: Malacomys
        - Big-eared swamp rat, Malacomys longipes LC
      - Genus: Mastomys
        - Guinea multimammate mouse, Mastomys erythroleucus LC
        - Natal multimammate mouse, Mastomys natalensis LC
      - Genus: Mus
        - Gounda mouse, Mus goundae DD
        - African pygmy mouse, Mus minutoides LC
        - Oubangui mouse, Mus oubanguii DD
        - Peters's mouse, Mus setulosus LC
      - Genus: Mylomys
        - African groove-toothed rat, Mylomys dybowskii LC
      - Genus: Myomyscus
        - Brockman's rock mouse, Myomyscus brockmani LC
      - Genus: Oenomys
        - Common rufous-nosed rat, Oenomys hypoxanthus LC
      - Genus: Praomys
        - Dalton's mouse, Praomys daltoni LC
        - Jackson's soft-furred mouse, Praomys jacksoni LC
        - Petter's soft-furred mouse, Praomys petteri LC
      - Genus: Stochomys
        - Target rat, Stochomys longicaudatus LC
      - Genus: Zelotomys
        - Hildegarde's broad-headed mouse, Zelotomys hildegardeae LC

== Order: Lagomorpha (lagomorphs) ==
The lagomorphs comprise two families, Leporidae (hares and rabbits), and Ochotonidae (pikas). Though they can resemble rodents, and were classified as a superfamily in that order until the early 20th century, they have since been considered a separate order. They differ from rodents in a number of physical characteristics, such as having four incisors in the upper jaw rather than two.

- Family: Leporidae (rabbits, hares)
  - Genus: Poelagus
    - Bunyoro rabbit, Poelagus marjorita LR/lc
  - Genus: Lepus
    - Cape hare, Lepus capensis LR/lc
    - African savanna hare, Lepus microtis LR/lc

== Order: Erinaceomorpha (hedgehogs and gymnures) ==
The order Erinaceomorpha contains a single family, Erinaceidae, which comprise the hedgehogs and gymnures. The hedgehogs are easily recognised by their spines while gymnures look more like large rats.

- Family: Erinaceidae (hedgehogs)
  - Subfamily: Erinaceinae
    - Genus: Atelerix
      - Four-toed hedgehog, Atelerix albiventris LR/lc

== Order: Soricomorpha (shrews, moles, and solenodons) ==
The "shrew-forms" are insectivorous mammals. The shrews and solenodons closely resemble mice while the moles are stout-bodied burrowers.

- Family: Soricidae (shrews)
  - Subfamily: Crocidurinae
    - Genus: Crocidura
      - Hun shrew, Crocidura attila LC
      - Long-footed shrew, Crocidura crenata LC
      - Dent's shrew, Crocidura denti LC
      - Long-tailed musk shrew, Crocidura dolichura LC
      - Fox's shrew, Crocidura foxi LC
      - Savanna shrew, Crocidura fulvastra LC
      - Bicolored musk shrew, Crocidura fuscomurina LC
      - Goliath shrew, Crocidura goliath LC
      - Grasse's shrew, Crocidura grassei LC
      - Hildegarde's shrew, Crocidura hildegardeae LC
      - Butiaba naked-tailed shrew, Crocidura littoralis LC
      - Ludia's shrew, Crocidura ludia LC
      - African black shrew, Crocidura nigrofusca LC
      - Small-footed shrew, Crocidura parvipes LC
      - Roosevelt's shrew, Crocidura roosevelti LC
      - Turbo shrew, Crocidura turba LC
      - Voi shrew, Crocidura voi LC
      - Yankari shrew, Crocidura yankariensis LC
    - Genus: Paracrocidura
      - Lesser large-headed shrew, Paracrocidura schoutedeni LC
    - Genus: Suncus
      - Least dwarf shrew, Suncus infinitesimus LC
      - Remy's pygmy shrew, Suncus remyi LC
    - Genus: Sylvisorex
      - Johnston's forest shrew, Sylvisorex johnstoni LC
      - Kongana shrew, Sylvisorex konganensis DD
      - Climbing shrew, Sylvisorex megalura LC
      - Greater forest shrew, Sylvisorex ollula LC
  - Subfamily: Myosoricinae
    - Genus: Congosorex
      - Lesser Congo shrew, Congosorex verheyeni LC

== Order: Chiroptera (bats) ==
The bats' most distinguishing feature is that their forelimbs are developed as wings, making them the only mammals capable of flight. Bat species account for about 20% of all mammals.

- Family: Pteropodidae (flying foxes, Old World fruit bats)
  - Subfamily: Pteropodinae
    - Genus: Casinycteris
      - Short-palated fruit bat, Casinycteris argynnis NT
    - Genus: Eidolon
      - Straw-coloured fruit bat, Eidolon helvum LC
    - Genus: Epomophorus
      - Gambian epauletted fruit bat, Epomophorus gambianus LC
    - Genus: Epomops
      - Franquet's epauletted fruit bat, Epomops franqueti LC
    - Genus: Hypsignathus
      - Hammer-headed bat, Hypsignathus monstrosus LC
    - Genus: Lissonycteris
      - Angolan rousette, Lissonycteris angolensis LC
    - Genus: Micropteropus
      - Peters's dwarf epauletted fruit bat, Micropteropus pusillus LC
    - Genus: Myonycteris
      - Little collared fruit bat, Myonycteris torquata LC
    - Genus: Nanonycteris
      - Veldkamp's dwarf epauletted fruit bat, Nanonycteris veldkampi LC
    - Genus: Scotonycteris
      - Zenker's fruit bat, Scotonycteris zenkeri NT
  - Subfamily: Macroglossinae
    - Genus: Megaloglossus
      - Woermann's bat, Megaloglossus woermanni LC
- Family: Vespertilionidae
  - Subfamily: Kerivoulinae
    - Genus: Kerivoula
      - Lesser woolly bat, Kerivoula lanosa LC
  - Subfamily: Myotinae
    - Genus: Myotis
      - Rufous mouse-eared bat, Myotis bocagii LC
  - Subfamily: Vespertilioninae
    - Genus: Glauconycteris
      - Beatrix's bat, Glauconycteris beatrix NT
      - Allen's spotted bat, Glauconycteris humeralis DD
    - Genus: Mimetillus
      - Moloney's mimic bat, Mimetillus moloneyi LC
    - Genus: Neoromicia
      - Cape serotine, Neoromicia capensis LC
      - Tiny serotine, Neoromicia guineensis LC
      - Banana pipistrelle, Neoromicia nanus LC
      - Rendall's serotine, Neoromicia rendalli LC
      - Somali serotine, Neoromicia somalicus LC
    - Genus: Nycticeinops
      - Schlieffen's bat, Nycticeinops schlieffeni LC
    - Genus: Pipistrellus
      - Tiny pipistrelle, Pipistrellus nanulus LC
      - Rüppell's pipistrelle, Pipistrellus rueppelli LC
      - Rusty pipistrelle, Pipistrellus rusticus LC
    - Genus: Scotoecus
      - Dark-winged lesser house bat, Scotoecus hirundo DD
    - Genus: Scotophilus
      - African yellow bat, Scotophilus dinganii LC
      - White-bellied yellow bat, Scotophilus leucogaster LC
      - Greenish yellow bat, Scotophilus viridis LC
  - Subfamily: Miniopterinae
    - Genus: Miniopterus
      - Greater long-fingered bat, Miniopterus inflatus LC
- Family: Rhinopomatidae
  - Genus: Rhinopoma
    - Greater mouse-tailed bat, Rhinopoma microphyllum LC
- Family: Molossidae
  - Genus: Chaerephon
    - Duke of Abruzzi's free-tailed bat, Chaerephon aloysiisabaudiae NT
    - Gland-tailed free-tailed bat, Chaerephon bemmeleni LC
  - Genus: Mops
    - Sierra Leone free-tailed bat, Mops brachypterus LC
    - Midas free-tailed bat, Mops midas LC
    - Spurrell's free-tailed bat, Mops spurrelli LC
    - Railer bat, Mops thersites LC
    - Trevor's free-tailed bat, Mops trevori VU
  - Genus: Myopterus
    - Daubenton's free-tailed bat, Myopterus daubentonii NT
    - Bini free-tailed bat, Myopterus whitleyi LC
  - Genus: Otomops
    - Large-eared free-tailed bat, Otomops martiensseni NT
- Family: Emballonuridae
  - Genus: Coleura
    - African sheath-tailed bat, Coleura afra LC
  - Genus: Taphozous
    - Mauritian tomb bat, Taphozous mauritianus LC
- Family: Nycteridae
  - Genus: Nycteris
    - Large slit-faced bat, Nycteris grandis LC
    - Hairy slit-faced bat, Nycteris hispida LC
    - Large-eared slit-faced bat, Nycteris macrotis LC
    - Ja slit-faced bat, Nycteris major VU
    - Dwarf slit-faced bat, Nycteris nana LC
    - Egyptian slit-faced bat, Nycteris thebaica LC
- Family: Megadermatidae
  - Genus: Lavia
    - Yellow-winged bat, Lavia frons LC
- Family: Rhinolophidae
  - Subfamily: Rhinolophinae
    - Genus: Rhinolophus
      - Rüppell's horseshoe bat, Rhinolophus fumigatus LC
      - Lander's horseshoe bat, Rhinolophus landeri LC
  - Subfamily: Hipposiderinae
    - Genus: Hipposideros
      - Aba roundleaf bat, Hipposideros abae NT
      - Benito roundleaf bat, Hipposideros beatus LC
      - Cyclops roundleaf bat, Hipposideros cyclops LC
      - Giant roundleaf bat, Hipposideros gigas LC
      - Commerson's roundleaf bat, Hipposideros marungensis NT
      - Noack's roundleaf bat, Hipposideros ruber LC
    - Genus: Triaenops
      - Persian trident bat, Triaenops persicus LC

== Order: Pholidota (pangolins) ==
The order Pholidota comprises the eight species of pangolin. Pangolins are anteaters and have the powerful claws, elongated snout and long tongue seen in the other unrelated anteater species.

- Family: Manidae
  - Genus: Manis
    - Giant pangolin, Manis gigantea LR/lc
    - Ground pangolin, Manis temminckii LR/nt
    - Long-tailed pangolin, Manis tetradactyla LR/lc
    - Tree pangolin, Manis tricuspis LR/lc

== Order: Carnivora (carnivorans) ==
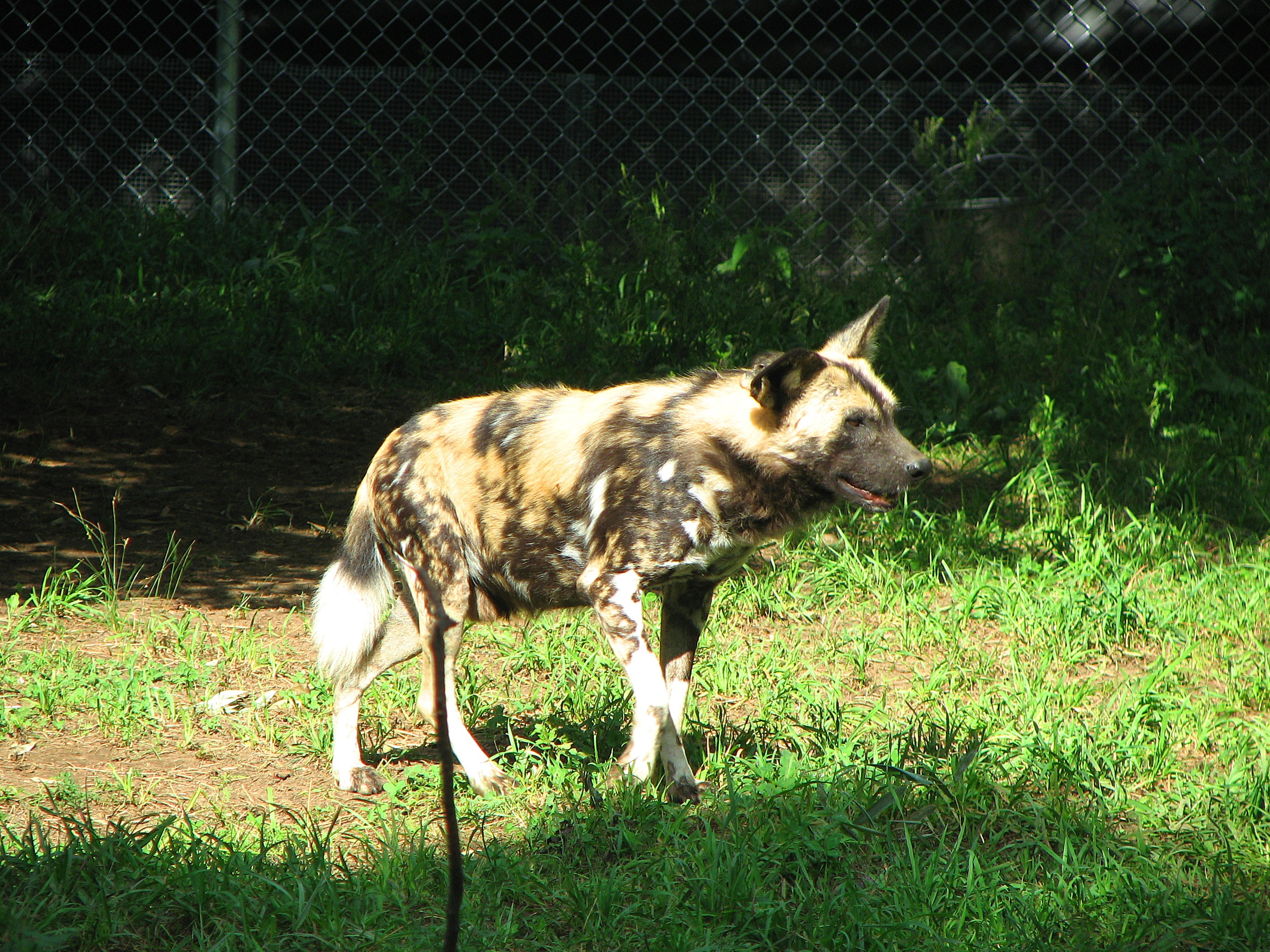
African wild dog

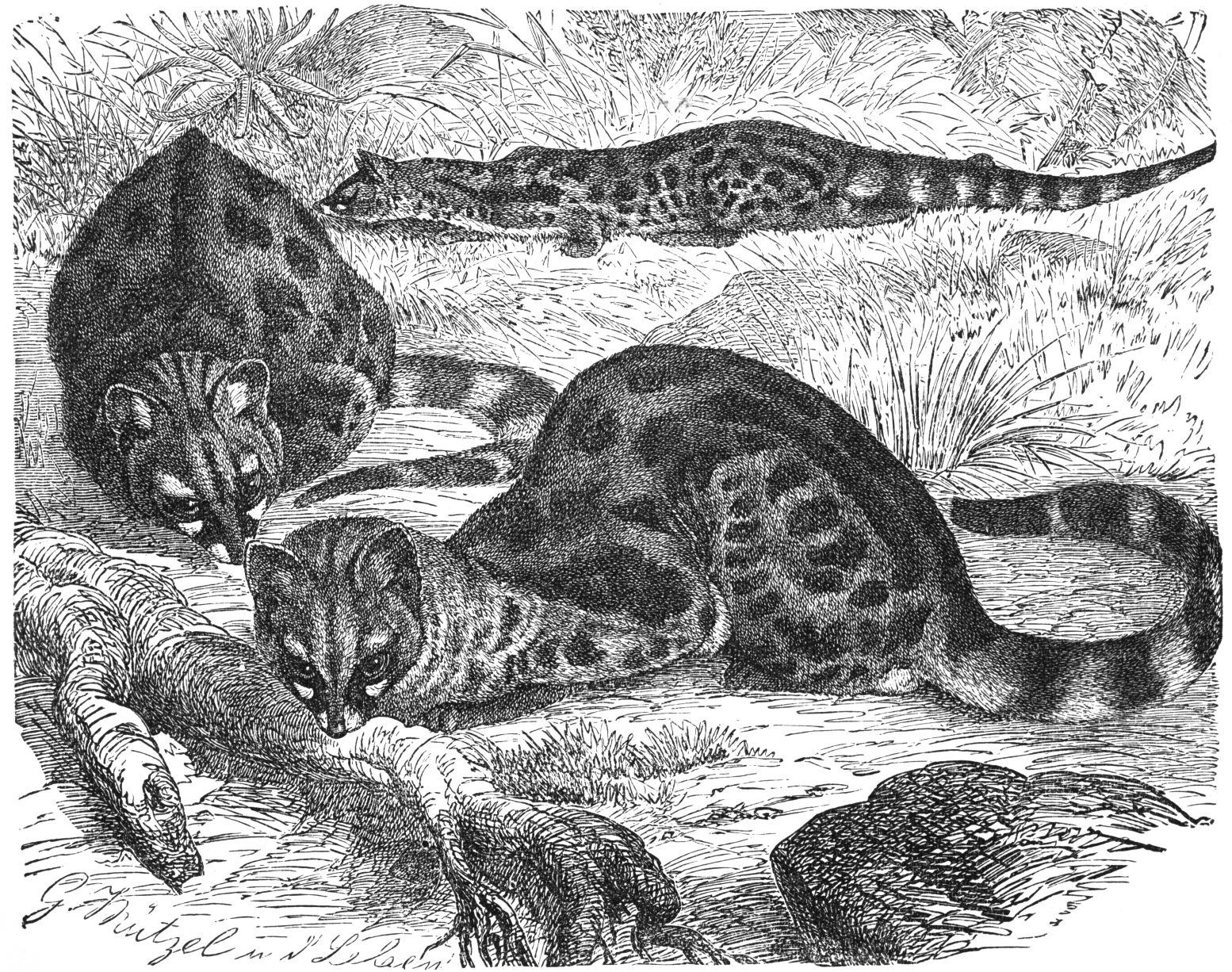
Common genet

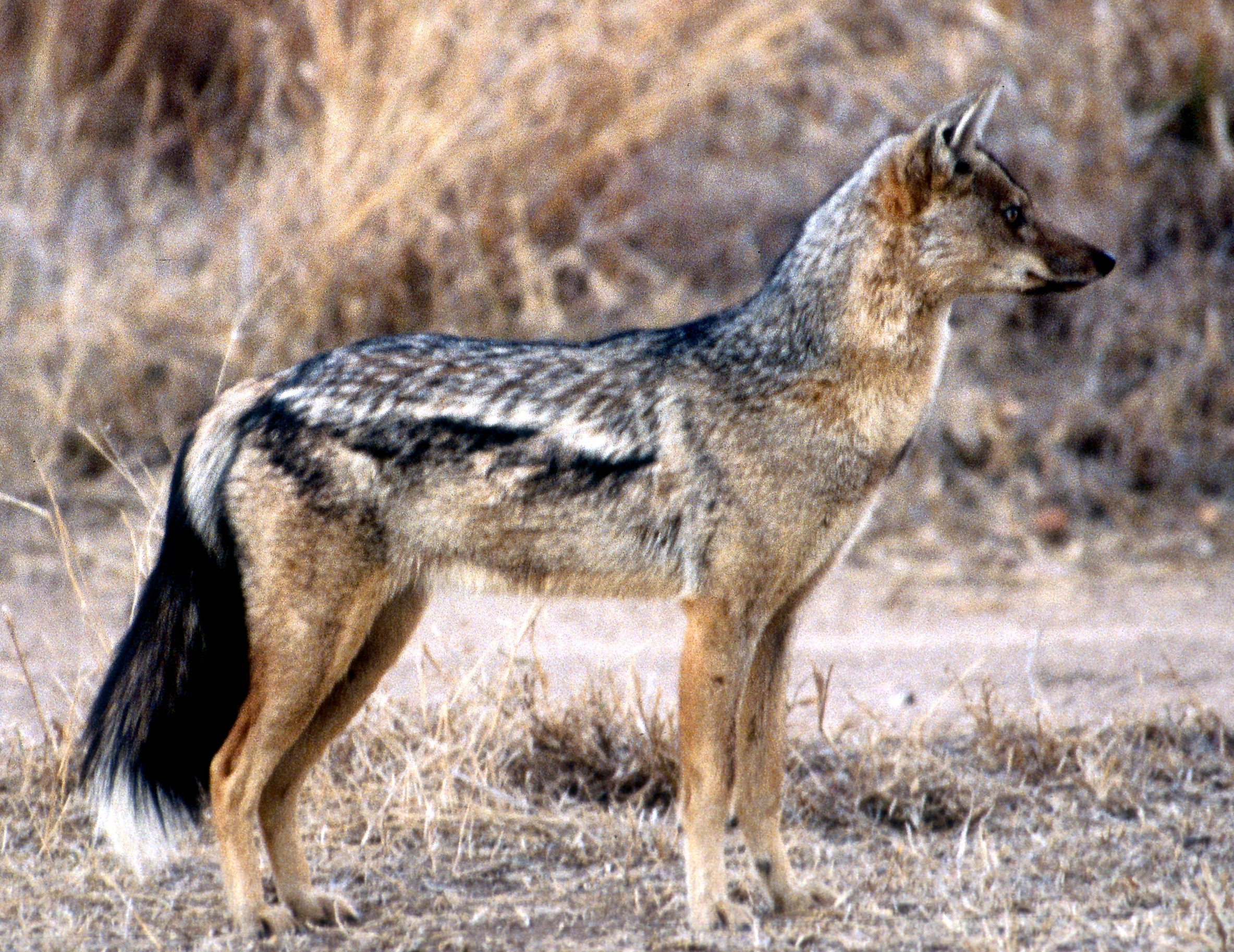
Side-striped jackal

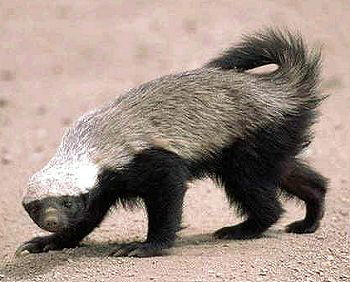
Honey badger

There are over 260 species of carnivorans, the majority of which feed primarily on meat. They have a characteristic skull shape and dentition.

- Suborder: Feliformia
  - Family: Felidae (cats)
    - Subfamily: Felinae
      - Genus: Acinonyx
        - Cheetah, A. jubatus VU
          - Northwest African cheetah, A. j. hecki CR
      - Genus: Caracal
        - African golden cat, C. aurata VU
        - Caracal, C. caracal LC
      - Genus: Leptailurus
        - Serval, L. serval LC
    - Subfamily: Pantherinae
      - Genus: Panthera
        - Lion, P. leo VU
        - Leopard, P. pardus VU
  - Family: Viverridae
    - Subfamily: Viverrinae
      - Genus: Civettictis
        - African civet, C. civetta LC
      - Genus: Genetta
        - Common genet, G. genetta LC
        - Rusty-spotted genet, G. maculata LC
        - Servaline genet, G. servalina LC
      - Genus: Poiana
        - Central African oyan, P. richardsonii LC
  - Family: Nandiniidae
    - Genus: Nandinia
      - African palm civet, N. binotata LC
  - Family: Herpestidae (mongooses)
    - Genus: Crossarchus
      - Alexander's kusimanse, C. alexandri LC
    - Genus: Dologale
      - Pousargues's mongoose, D. dybowskii DD
    - Genus: Herpestes
      - Common slender mongoose, H. sanguineus LC
    - Genus: Ichneumia
      - White-tailed mongoose, I. albicauda LC
    - Genus: Mungos
      - Banded mongoose, M. mungo LC
  - Family: Hyaenidae (hyaenas)
    - Genus: Crocuta
      - Spotted hyena, C. crocuta LC
    - Genus: Hyaena
      - Striped hyena, H. hyaena LC
- Suborder: Caniformia
  - Family: Canidae (dogs, foxes)
    - Genus: Canis
      - African golden wolf, C. lupaster LC
    - Genus: Lupulella
      - Side-striped jackal, L. adusta LC
    - Genus: Lycaon
      - African wild dog, L. pictus EN
  - Family: Mustelidae (mustelids)
    - Genus: Ictonyx
      - Striped polecat, I. striatus LC
    - Genus: Mellivora
      - Honey badger, M. capensis LC
    - Genus: Hydrictis
      - Speckle-throated otter, H. maculicollis NT

== Order: Artiodactyla (even-toed ungulates) ==
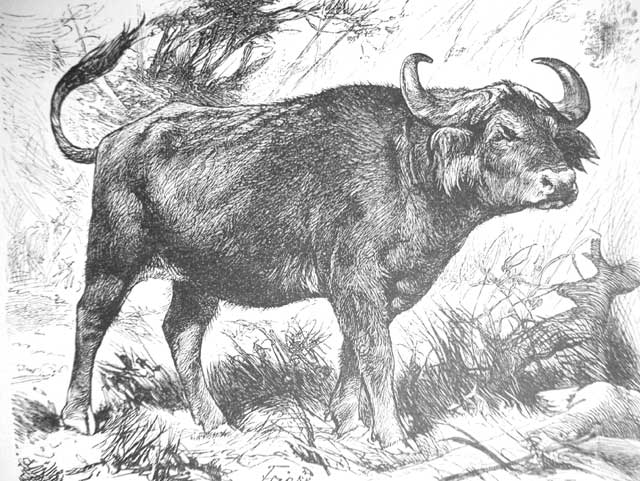
African buffalo

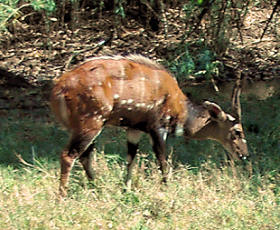
Bushbuck

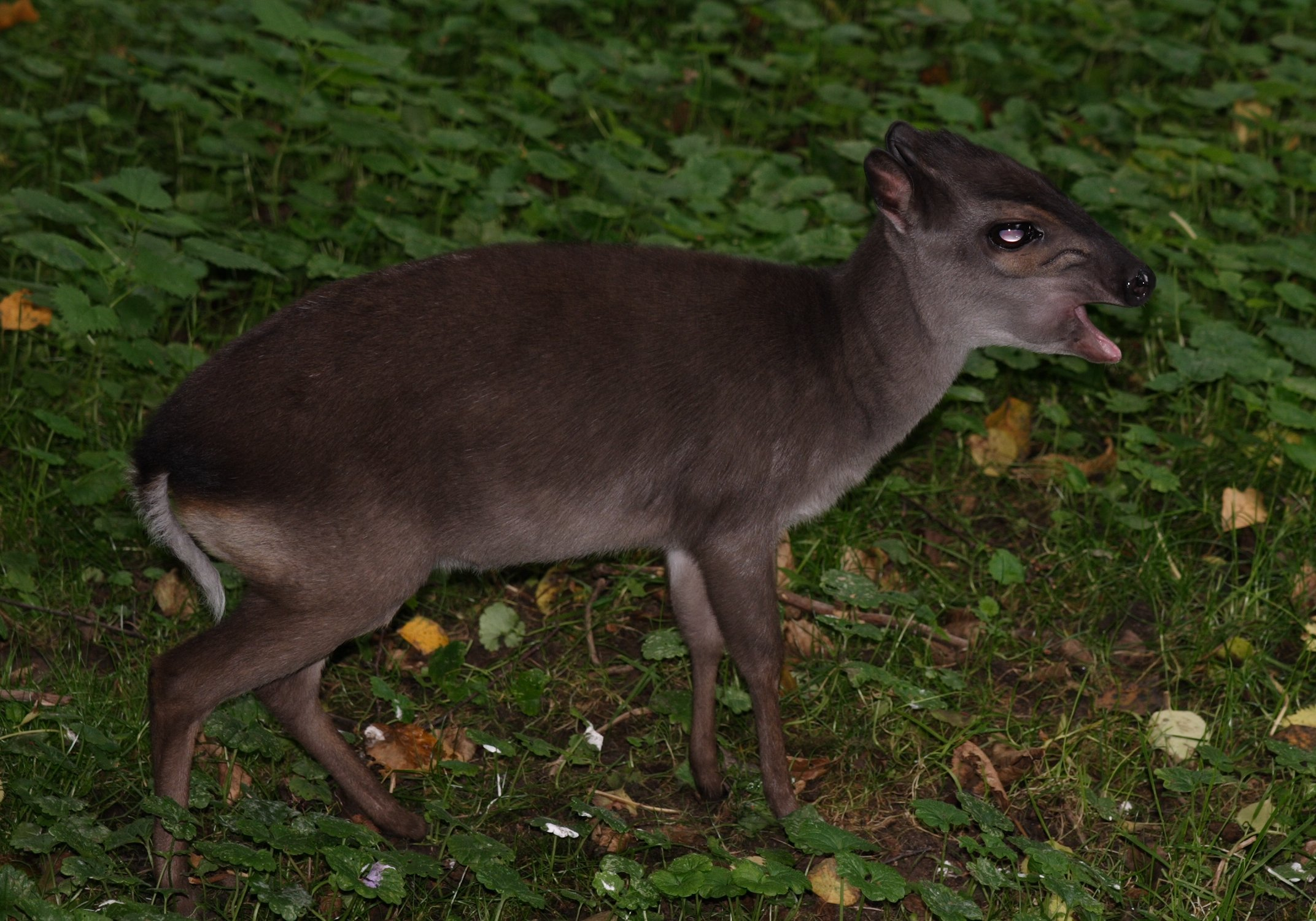
Blue duiker

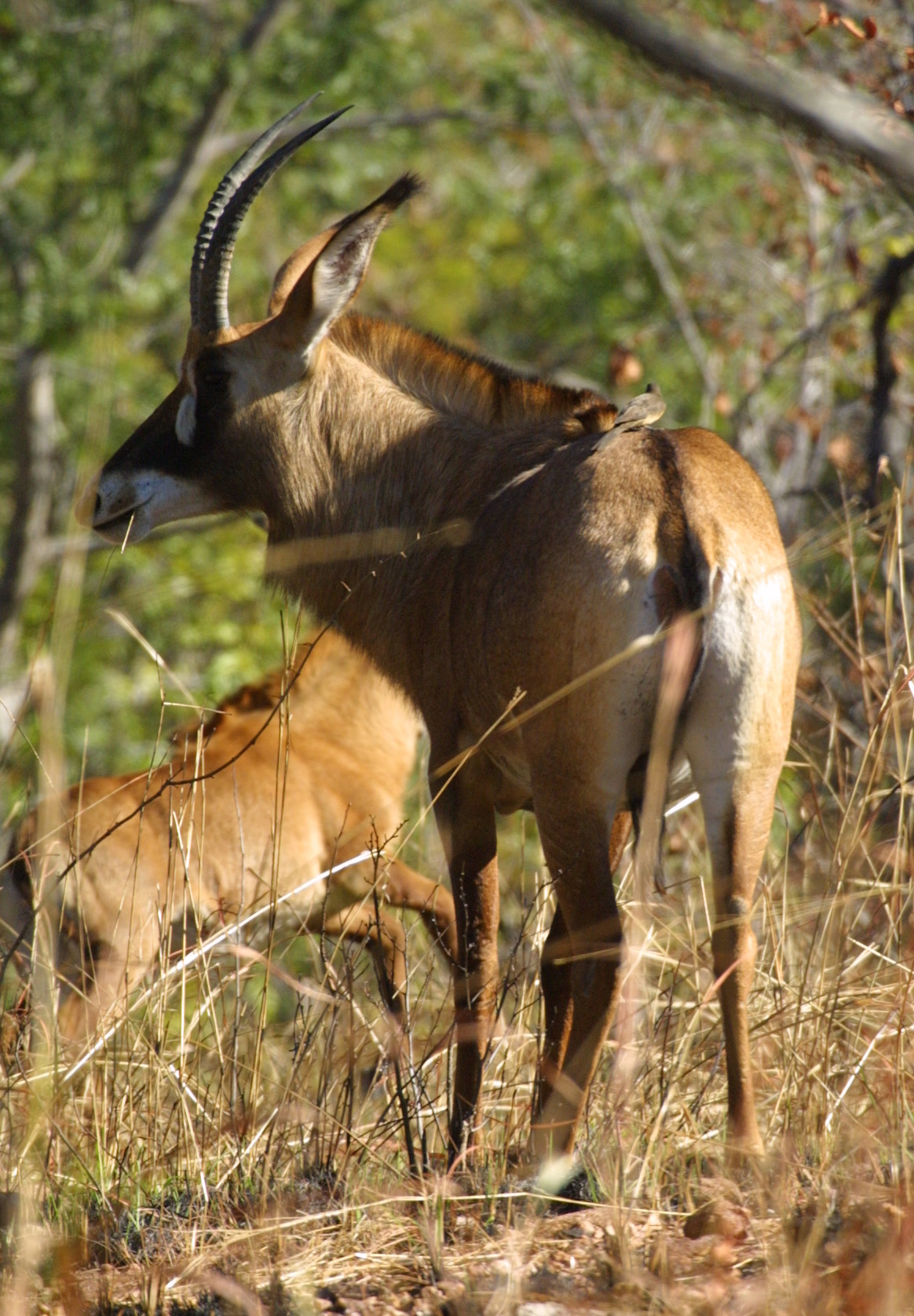
Roan antelope

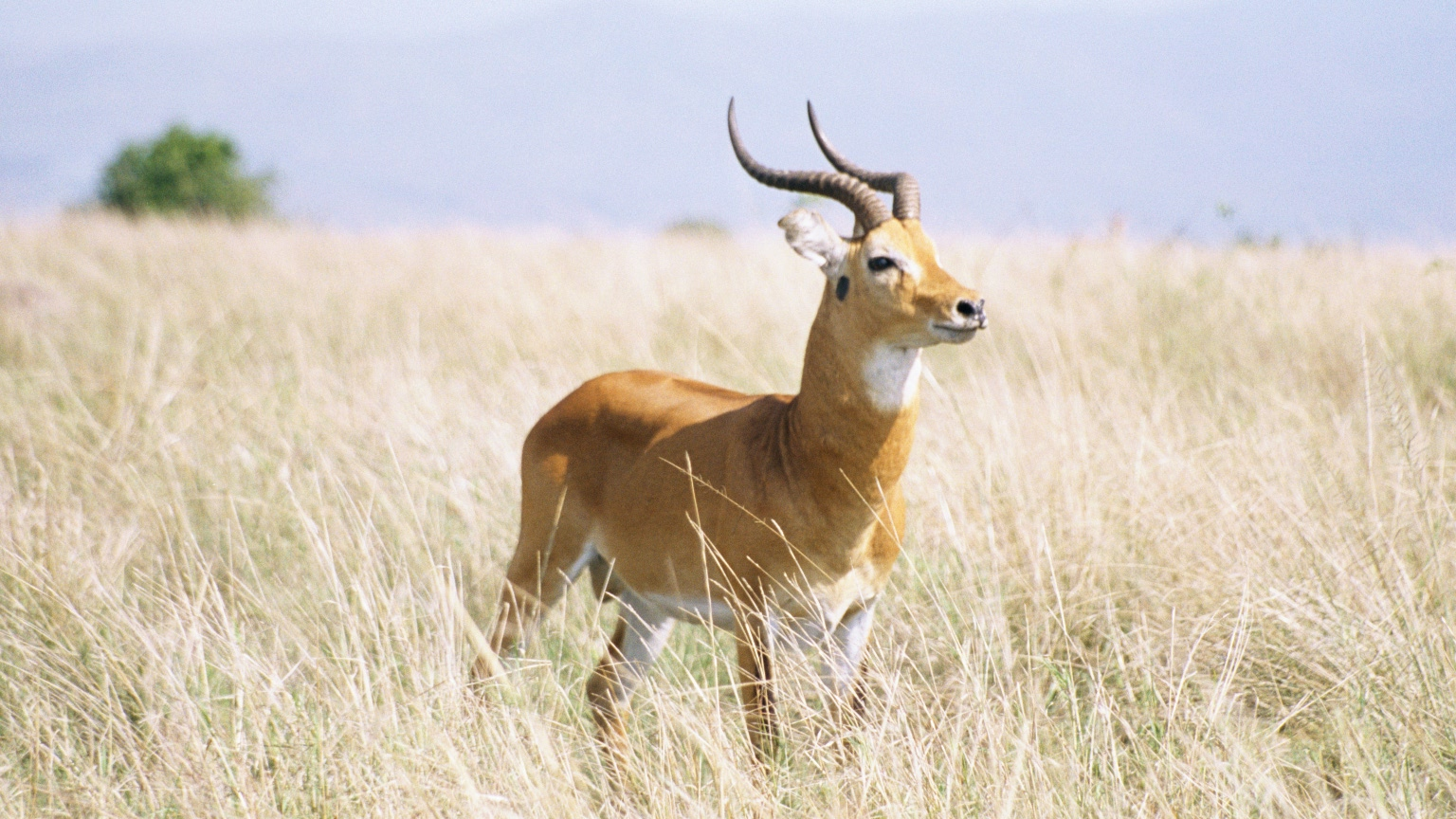
Kob

The even-toed ungulates are ungulates whose weight is borne about equally by the third and fourth toes, rather than mostly or entirely by the third as in perissodactyls. There are about 220 artiodactyl species, including many that are of great economic importance to humans.

- Family: Suidae (pigs)
  - Subfamily: Phacochoerinae
    - Genus: Phacochoerus
      - Common warthog, Phacochoerus africanus LR/lc
  - Subfamily: Suinae
    - Genus: Hylochoerus
      - Giant forest hog, Hylochoerus meinertzhageni LR/lc
    - Genus: Potamochoerus
      - Red river hog, Potamochoerus porcus LR/lc
- Family: Hippopotamidae (hippopotamuses)
  - Genus: Hippopotamus
    - Hippopotamus, H. amphibius VU
- Family: Tragulidae
  - Genus: Hyemoschus
    - Water chevrotain, Hyemoschus aquaticus DD
- Family: Giraffidae (giraffe, okapi)
  - Genus: Giraffa
    - Kordofan giraffe, Giraffa camelopardalis antiquorum EN
- Family: Bovidae (cattle, antelope, sheep, goats)
  - Subfamily: Alcelaphinae
    - Genus: Alcelaphus
      - Hartebeest, Alcelaphus buselaphus LR/cd
    - Genus: Damaliscus
      - Topi, Damaliscus lunatus LR/cd
  - Subfamily: Antilopinae
    - Genus: Gazella
      - Red-fronted gazelle, Gazella rufifrons VU
    - Genus: Neotragus
      - Bates's pygmy antelope, Neotragus batesi LR/nt
    - Genus: Oreotragus
      - Klipspringer, Oreotragus oreotragus LR/cd
    - Genus: Ourebia
      - Oribi, Ourebia ourebi LR/cd
  - Subfamily: Bovinae
    - Genus: Syncerus
      - African buffalo, Syncerus caffer LR/cd
    - Genus: Tragelaphus
      - Giant eland, Tragelaphus derbianus LR/nt
      - Bongo, Tragelaphus eurycerus LR/nt
      - Bushbuck, Tragelaphus scriptus LR/lc
      - Sitatunga, Tragelaphus spekii LR/nt
      - Greater kudu, Tragelaphus strepsiceros LR/cd
  - Subfamily: Cephalophinae
    - Genus: Cephalophus
      - Peters's duiker, Cephalophus callipygus LR/nt
      - Bay duiker, Cephalophus dorsalis LR/nt
      - White-bellied duiker, Cephalophus leucogaster LR/nt
      - Blue duiker, Cephalophus monticola LR/lc
      - Black-fronted duiker, Cephalophus nigrifrons LR/nt
      - Red-flanked duiker, Cephalophus rufilatus LR/cd
      - Yellow-backed duiker, Cephalophus silvicultor LR/nt
    - Genus: Sylvicapra
      - Common duiker, Sylvicapra grimmia LR/lc
  - Subfamily: Hippotraginae
    - Genus: Hippotragus
      - Roan antelope, Hippotragus equinus LR/cd
  - Subfamily: Reduncinae
    - Genus: Kobus
      - Waterbuck, Kobus ellipsiprymnus LR/cd
      - Kob, Kobus kob LR/cd
    - Genus: Redunca
      - Bohor reedbuck, Redunca redunca LR/cd

== See also ==
- List of chordate orders
- Lists of mammals by region
- List of prehistoric mammals
- Mammal classification
- List of mammals described in the 2000s
