= Du Chaillu's rope squirrel =

Conservation status
- Data Deficient (IUCN 3.1)

Scientific classification
- Kingdom: Animalia
- Phylum: Chordata
- Class: Mammalia
- Order: Rodentia
- Family: Sciuridae
- Subfamily: Xerinae
- Tribe: Protoxerini
- Genus: Funisciurus
- Species: F. duchaillui

Binomial name
- Funisciurus duchaillui Sanborn, 1953

Species of rodent

Du Chaillu's rope squirrel (Funisciurus duchaillui) is a species of rodent in the family Sciuridae. It is endemic to parts of central Gabon, within dense tropical rainforests, where it was listed as extinct in 1952, but was then rediscovered in 1993. The species is currently has a "Data Deficient" conservation status brought about by the IUCN Red List. It was named after French zoologist, traveler, and anthropologist Paul Du Chaillu.

== Description ==
Body on average reaches a length of 185–212 mm (7.3–8.3 in), with a 190–230 mm (7.5–9.1 in) long tail. Weight on average is around 195–205 g (6.9–7.2 oz). Olive-brown dorsum, with grey and white colorations around limbs. Four dark brown dorsal stripes spread down from its head, in a longitudinal manner. Banded hairs, that are green-yellow and have a black colored tip. Tail is a bright red-brown color, also with a black tip. Rarely seen in pairs.

== Diet ==
Du Chaillu's rope squirrel is known to feast upon the fruits of Xylopia aethiopica and any species from the genus Dialium.
