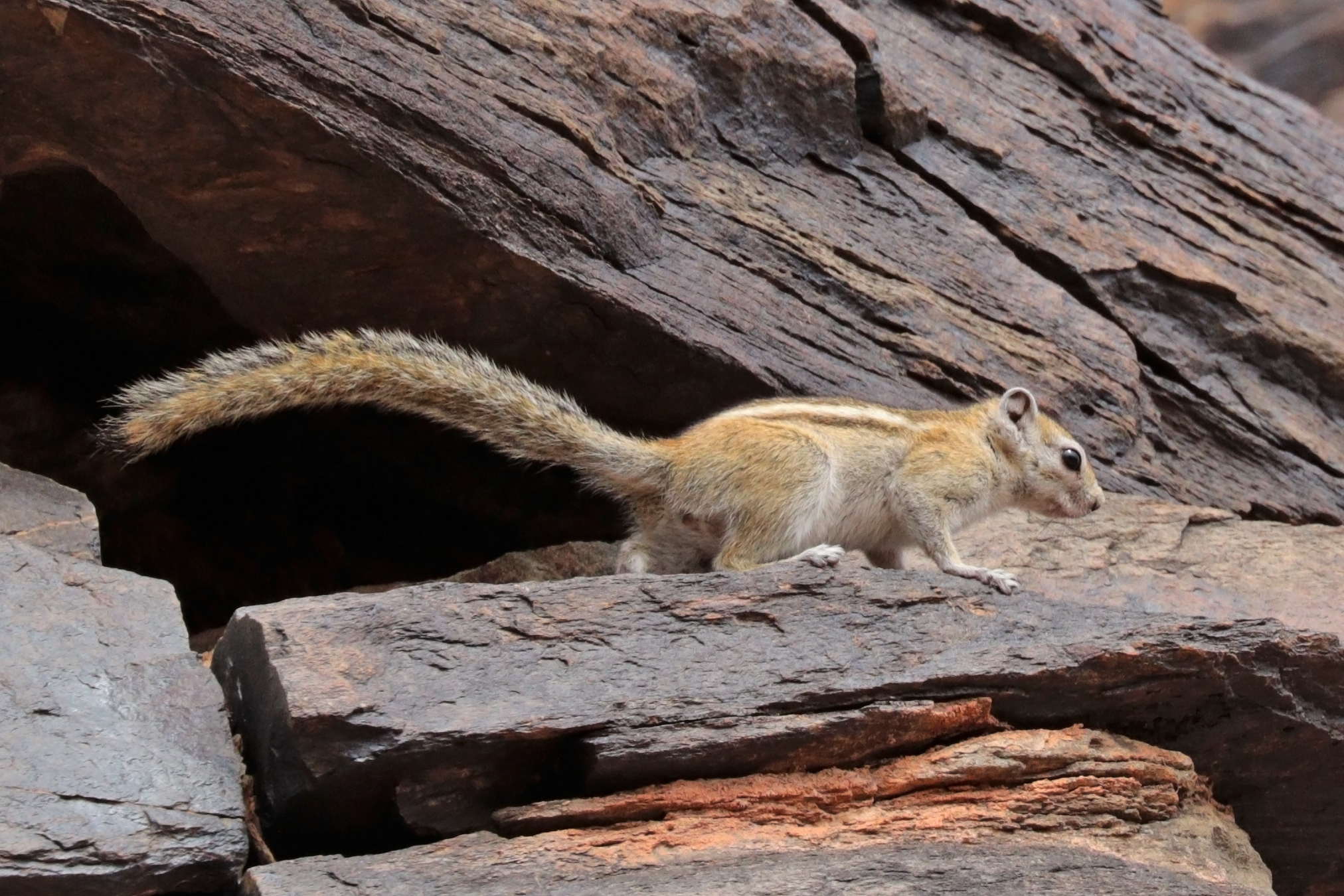
- Damaraland, Namibia

Conservation status
- Least Concern (IUCN 3.1)

Scientific classification
- Kingdom: Animalia
- Phylum: Chordata
- Class: Mammalia
- Order: Rodentia
- Family: Sciuridae
- Genus: Funisciurus
- Species: F. congicus

Binomial name
- Funisciurus congicus (Kuhl, 1820)

= Congo rope squirrel =

Species of rodent

The Congo rope squirrel (Funisciurus congicus) is a species of rodent in the family Sciuridae. It is found in the Democratic Republic of the Congo south of the Congo River, western Angola, and northern Namibia. It is mainly associated with dense woodland, but in Namibia also with vegetation on granite outcrops. It is diurnal and arboreal, but also forages on the ground.
