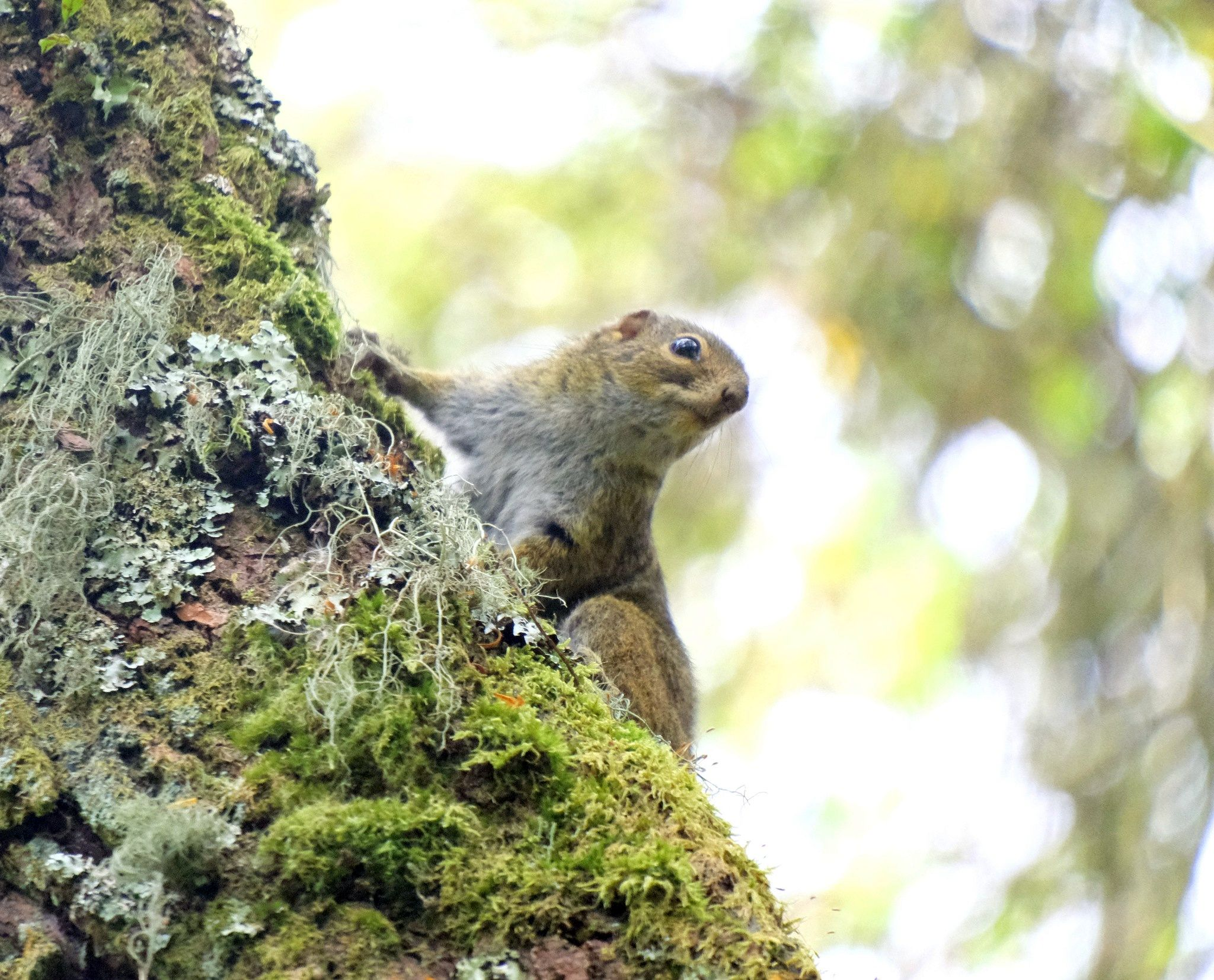

Conservation status
- Least Concern (IUCN 3.1)

Scientific classification
- Kingdom: Animalia
- Phylum: Chordata
- Class: Mammalia
- Order: Rodentia
- Family: Sciuridae
- Genus: Funisciurus
- Species: F. carruthersi

Binomial name
- Funisciurus carruthersi Thomas, 1906

Subspecies
- F. c. carruthersi; F. c. birungensis; F. c. chrysippus; F. c. tanganyikae

= Carruther's mountain squirrel =

Species of rodent

The Carruther's mountain squirrel (Funisciurus carruthersi) is a species of rodent in the family Sciuridae. It is found in Burundi, Democratic Republic of the Congo, Rwanda, and Uganda. Its natural habitat is tropical moist montane forests.

== Description ==
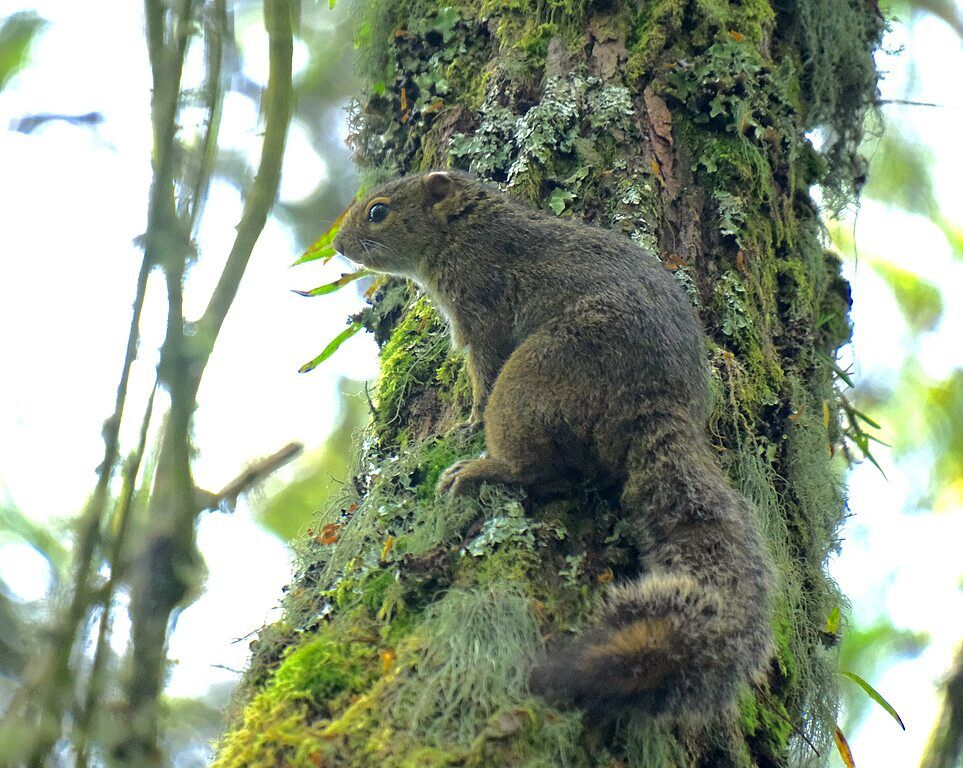
Funisciurus carruthersi seen from behind.
