= Lunda rope squirrel =

Conservation status
- Data Deficient (IUCN 3.1)

Scientific classification
- Kingdom: Animalia
- Phylum: Chordata
- Class: Mammalia
- Order: Rodentia
- Family: Sciuridae
- Genus: Funisciurus
- Species: F. bayonii

Binomial name
- Funisciurus bayonii (Bocage, 1890)

Species of rodent

The Lunda rope squirrel (Funisciurus bayonii) is a species of rodent in the family Sciuridae. It is found in Angola and Democratic Republic of the Congo. Its natural habitat is moist savanna.
