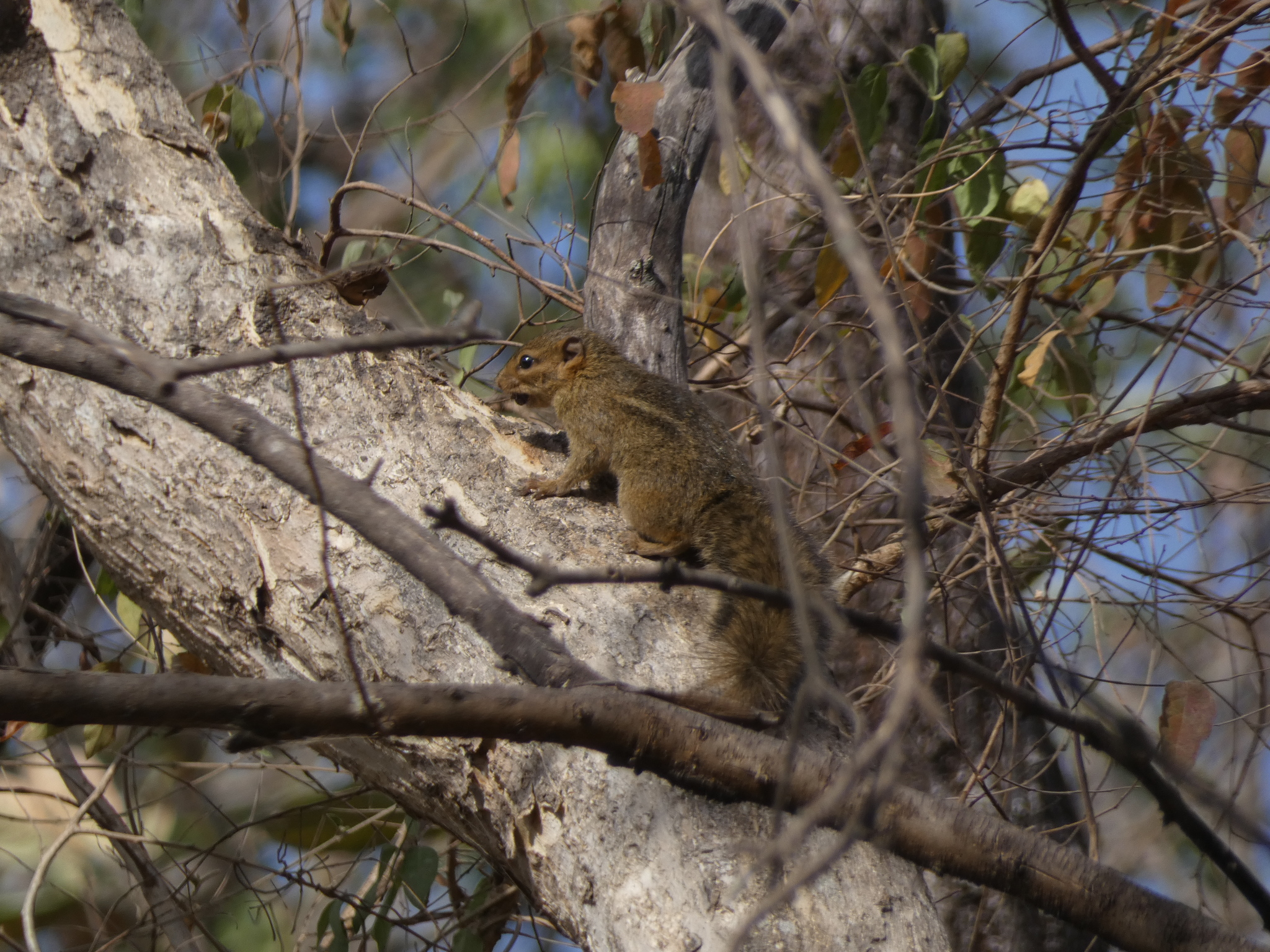

Conservation status
- Data Deficient (IUCN 3.1)

Scientific classification
- Kingdom: Animalia
- Phylum: Chordata
- Class: Mammalia
- Order: Rodentia
- Family: Sciuridae
- Genus: Funisciurus
- Species: F. substriatus

Binomial name
- Funisciurus substriatus de Winton, 1899

= Kintampo rope squirrel =

Species of rodent

The Kintampo rope squirrel (Funisciurus substriatus) is a species of rodent in the family Sciuridae. It is found in Benin, Burkina Faso, Ivory Coast, Ghana, Niger, and Togo. Its natural habitat is moist savanna.
