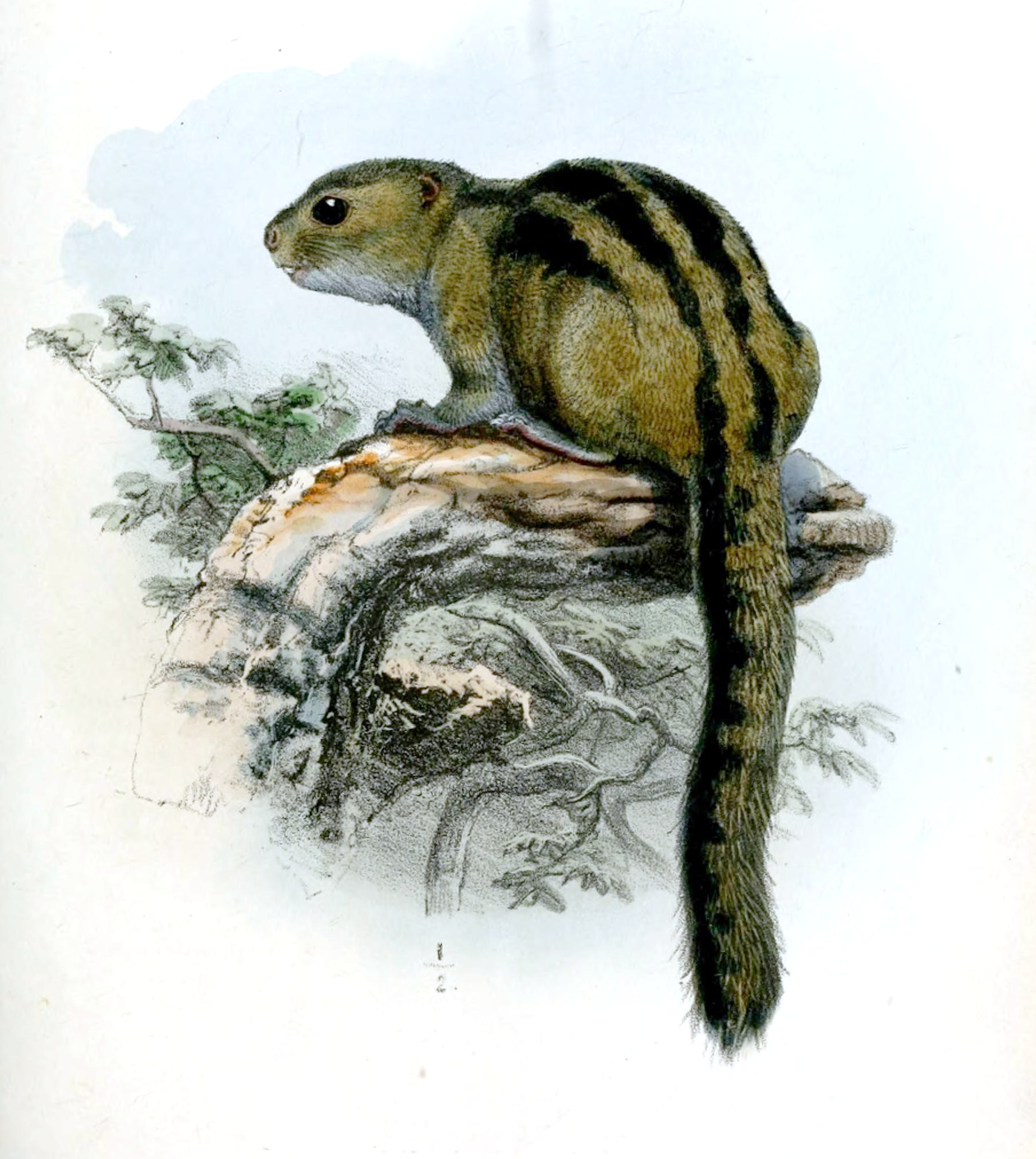

Conservation status
- Least Concern (IUCN 3.1)

Scientific classification
- Kingdom: Animalia
- Phylum: Chordata
- Class: Mammalia
- Order: Rodentia
- Family: Sciuridae
- Genus: Funisciurus
- Species: F. isabella

Binomial name
- Funisciurus isabella (J. E. Gray, 1862)

Subspecies
- F. i. isabella; F. i. dubosti

Synonyms
- Sciurus isabella J. E. Gray, 1862

= Lady Burton's rope squirrel =

Species of rodent native to central Africa

The Lady Burton's rope squirrel (Funisciurus isabella) is a species of rodent in the family Sciuridae. It is found in Cameroon, Central African Republic, Republic of the Congo, Equatorial Guinea, and Gabon. Its natural habitats are tropical and subtropical moist broadleaf forests and subtropical or tropical moist montane forest. It is a common species with a wide range, and the International Union for Conservation of Nature has rated it as being of "least concern".

== Taxonomy ==
This squirrel was first described in 1862 by the English zoologist John Edward Gray, the type specimen being collected from 2,000 m (7,000 ft) above sea level on Mount Cameroon. He gave it the name Sciurus isabella, the specific epithet "isabella" honouring Isabel Burton, the wife of the explorer and diplomat Sir Richard Burton who was at that time the British consul in Fernando Po. The species was later combined into the genus Funisciurus, giving the binomial name its currently accepted form, Funisciurus isabella.

== Description ==
The Lady Burton's rope squirrel is a fairly small squirrel growing to a head-and-body length of about 154 mm (6 in) with a slender tail of about 160 mm (6.3 in), males tending to be slightly larger than females. The dorsal fur is grizzled brown, the individual hairs having black shafts and buff tips. There are two black bands running along each side of the animal, one from the ears to the tail, and the second from the shoulder to the rump. Between the stripes, the fur is buffy-brown. The ventral fur is greyish, the individual hairs having grey shafts and white tips. The tail is clad in long hairs which have buff bases, black shafts and frosted buff tips. The ribboned rope squirrel (Funisciurus lemniscatus) is similar in appearance but differs in having darker brown fur along the spine, and paler, yellowish fur between the lateral stripes.

== Distribution and habitat ==
The Lady Burton's rope squirrel is endemic to western Central Africa. Its range includes southern Cameroon, Equatorial Guinea, Gabon, southwestern Central African Republic and the Republic of the Congo. It occurs in both lowland and montane moist forests, in the understory of dense secondary growth with vines and creepers, in plantations and old gardens, but not in the canopy of tall trees.

== Ecology ==
This squirrel most often moves about alone or in pairs, or occasionally in groups of three. They are quite vocal, one of the calls being a characteristic warbling alarm call. Because they spend most of their time foraging through dense undergrowth, vines and creepers, they can often be identified by the sounds they make rather than visually. They feed mostly on fruits and seeds, but also consume small quantities of green leafy material, arthropods, such as ants, termites and caterpillars, and fungi. The nest is a ball of leaves and fibres, and a single offspring at a time seems to be normal.

== Status ==
This squirrel has a wide range and is a common species. It is presumed to have a large total population and occur in several protected areas. No particular threats have been identified, although it is hunted for food, and the International Union for Conservation of Nature has assessed its conservation status as being of "least concern".
