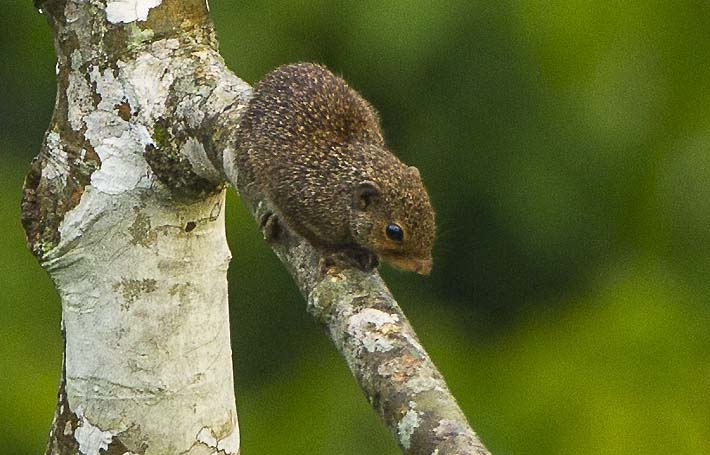

Conservation status
- Least Concern (IUCN 3.1)

Scientific classification
- Kingdom: Animalia
- Phylum: Chordata
- Class: Mammalia
- Order: Rodentia
- Family: Sciuridae
- Tribe: Protoxerini
- Genus: Epixerus; Thomas, 1909
- Species: E. ebii

Binomial name
- Epixerus ebii (Temminck, 1853)

Subspecies
- E. e. ebii; E. e. jonesi; E. e. wilsoni
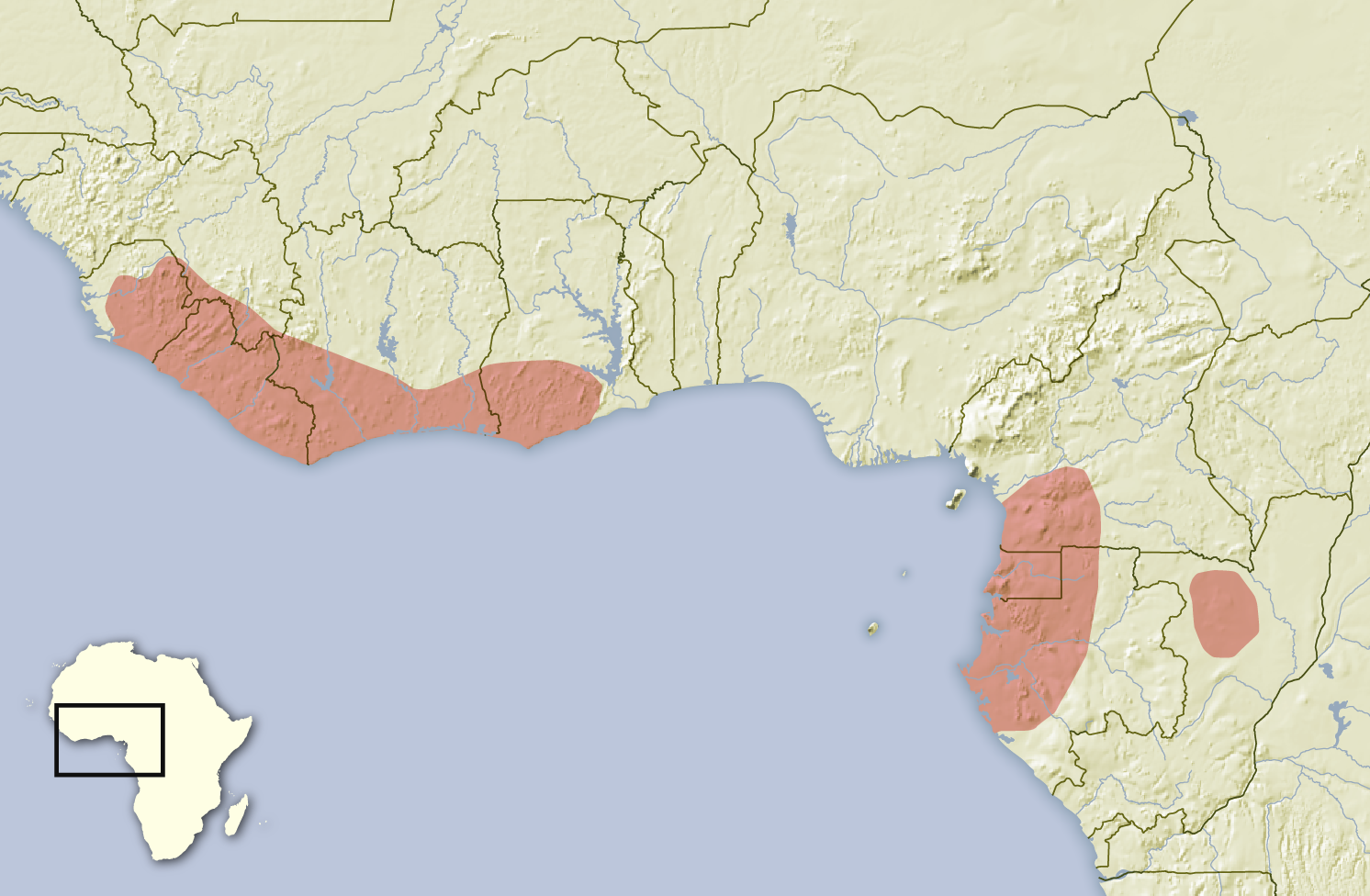
- Range of western palm squirrel

= Ebian's palm squirrel =

Genus of rodents

Epixerus ebii, also known as Ebian's palm squirrel, Temminck's giant squirrel, or the western palm squirrel, is a species of rodent in the family Sciuridae. It is the only species in the genus Epixerus, although eastern populations (subspecies Epixerus ebii wilsoni) were previously regarded as a separate species, E. wilsoni. It is found in West and Central Africa. Its natural habitat is subtropical or tropical moist lowland forests. It is threatened by habitat loss.
