= Epixerus ebii wilsoni =

Scientific classification
- Kingdom: Animalia
- Phylum: Chordata
- Class: Mammalia
- Order: Rodentia
- Family: Sciuridae
- Genus: Epixerus
- Species: E. ebii
- Subspecies: E. e. wilsoni

Trinomial name
- Epixerus ebii wilsoni (Du Chaillu, 1860)

Synonyms
- Epixerus wilsoni; mayumbicus Verheyen, 1959

Subspecies of rodent

Epixerus ebii wilsoni is a subspecies of the squirrel Epixerus ebii from Cameroon, Republic of the Congo, Equatorial Guinea, and Gabon. It has also been treated as a separate species. Its natural habitat is subtropical or tropical moist lowland forests. It is threatened by habitat loss.
