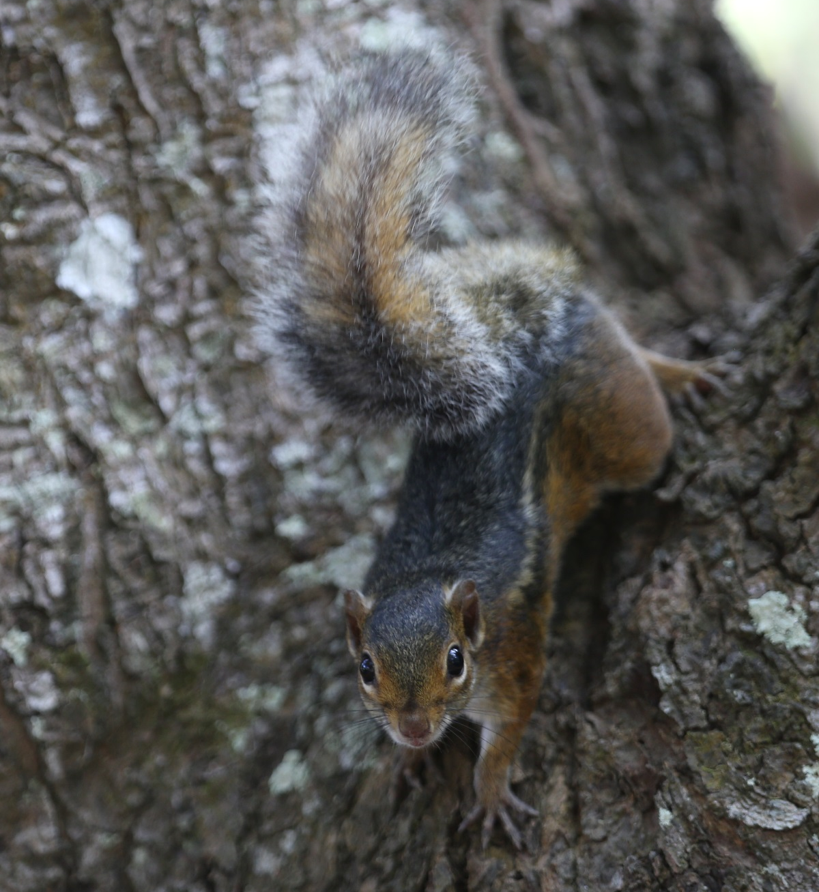

Conservation status
- Least Concern (IUCN 3.1)

Scientific classification
- Kingdom: Animalia
- Phylum: Chordata
- Class: Mammalia
- Infraclass: Placentalia
- Order: Rodentia
- Family: Sciuridae
- Genus: Funisciurus
- Species: F. pyrropus

Binomial name
- Funisciurus pyrropus (F. Cuvier, 1833)

Subspecies
- F. p. pyrropus; F. p. akka; F. p. leonis; F. p. leucostigma; F. p. mandingo; F. p. nigrensis; F. p. niveatus; F. p. pembertoni; F. p. talboti
- Geographic range

= Fire-footed rope squirrel =

Species of rodent

The fire-footed rope squirrel (Funisciurus pyrropus) is a species of rodent in the family Sciuridae.

== Description ==
It is a relatively small rodent with an adult averaging at a height of 8.1 inches (204.81 mm). Adults weigh between 225 and 240 grams (7.9 and 8.5 oz).

== Habitat ==
It is found in West and Central Africa from Senegal to Uganda and south to Angola. Its natural habitats are subtropical or tropical moist lowland forests, moist savanna, and plantations.

== Diet ==
They are primarily herbivores. Their main diet consists of fruit and seeds. When food is scarce, they resort to eating small termites and ants.

== Mating ==
Several male squirrels chase a single female squirrel in a ritualistic chase. They bear litters of one to two pups.

== Zoonotic risk ==
It is recognized as a potential zoonotic reservoir for the monkeypox virus (MPXV; Orthopoxvirus monkeypox), it has transmitted the virus to sooty mangabeys.
