= Thomas's rope squirrel =

Conservation status
- Least Concern (IUCN 3.1)

Scientific classification
- Kingdom: Animalia
- Phylum: Chordata
- Class: Mammalia
- Order: Rodentia
- Family: Sciuridae
- Genus: Funisciurus
- Species: F. anerythrus

Binomial name
- Funisciurus anerythrus (Thomas, 1890)

Subspecies
- F. a. anerythrus; F. a. bandarum; F. a. mystax; F. a. raptorum

Species of mammal

Thomas's rope squirrel or redless tree squirrel (Funisciurus anerythrus) is a species of rodent in the family Sciuridae. It is found in Benin, Cameroon, Central African Republic, Democratic Republic of the Congo, Equatorial Guinea, Gabon, and Nigeria. Its natural habitat is subtropical or tropical moist lowland forests. It is a common species and the International Union for Conservation of Nature has rated it as being of "least concern".

== Description ==
This is a medium-sized squirrel growing to a head-and-body length of about 180 mm (7 in) with a bushy tail of about 160 mm (6.3 in). The dorsal fur is a plain, grizzled brown, with a single buff stripe, bordered with dark brown below, running from the shoulder to the hindquarters. The underparts are whitish, dull grey or orange, and the limbs are buff. The hairs of the tail have reddish bases, dark shafts and pale tips. When the squirrel is at rest, the tail is curled up close to the back, and when the animal is moving, it is often held vertically with the tip curling backwards.

== Distribution and habitat ==
Thomas's rope squirrel occurs in tropical West and Central Africa. Its range is divided into two areas, and there is the possibility that two separate species are involved. One population is in Benin and Nigeria, and the other in Cameroon, Equatorial Guinea, northern Gabon, the Central African Republic and the Democratic Republic of the Congo. It usually inhabits primary, moist, lowland forest but also occurs in secondary forest and in gallery forest. It predominantly occupies wet habitats such as raffia palm and other swamp forests, seasonally flooded areas, riverbanks and islands in rivers. In Nigeria, it tends to be found in secondary forests in the tangled undergrowth of shrubs and creepers, and even partway up moderate-sized trees.

== Ecology ==
Thomas's rope squirrel forages on the ground and in trees for fruits and seeds, also consuming arthropods (mostly ants and termites), and small quantities of green leafy material and fungi. The fruits of the raffia palm are a favourite food and may be cached temporarily in crevices. Several squirrels sometimes frequent a single palm tree, and communicate vocally or by stamping. Two squirrels often move about in company, resting side by side and grooming each other. Globular nests are made of leaves and lined with fibres, and are built in undergrowth, on branches or on the central rachis of palm leaves, often overhanging water. Breeding takes place at any time of year, with litters usually consisting of one or two young.

== Conservation status ==
This squirrel has a wide range; it is a common species in suitable habitat and is presumed to have a large total population. No particular threats have been identified, so the International Union for Conservation of Nature has assessed its conservation status as being of "least concern".
