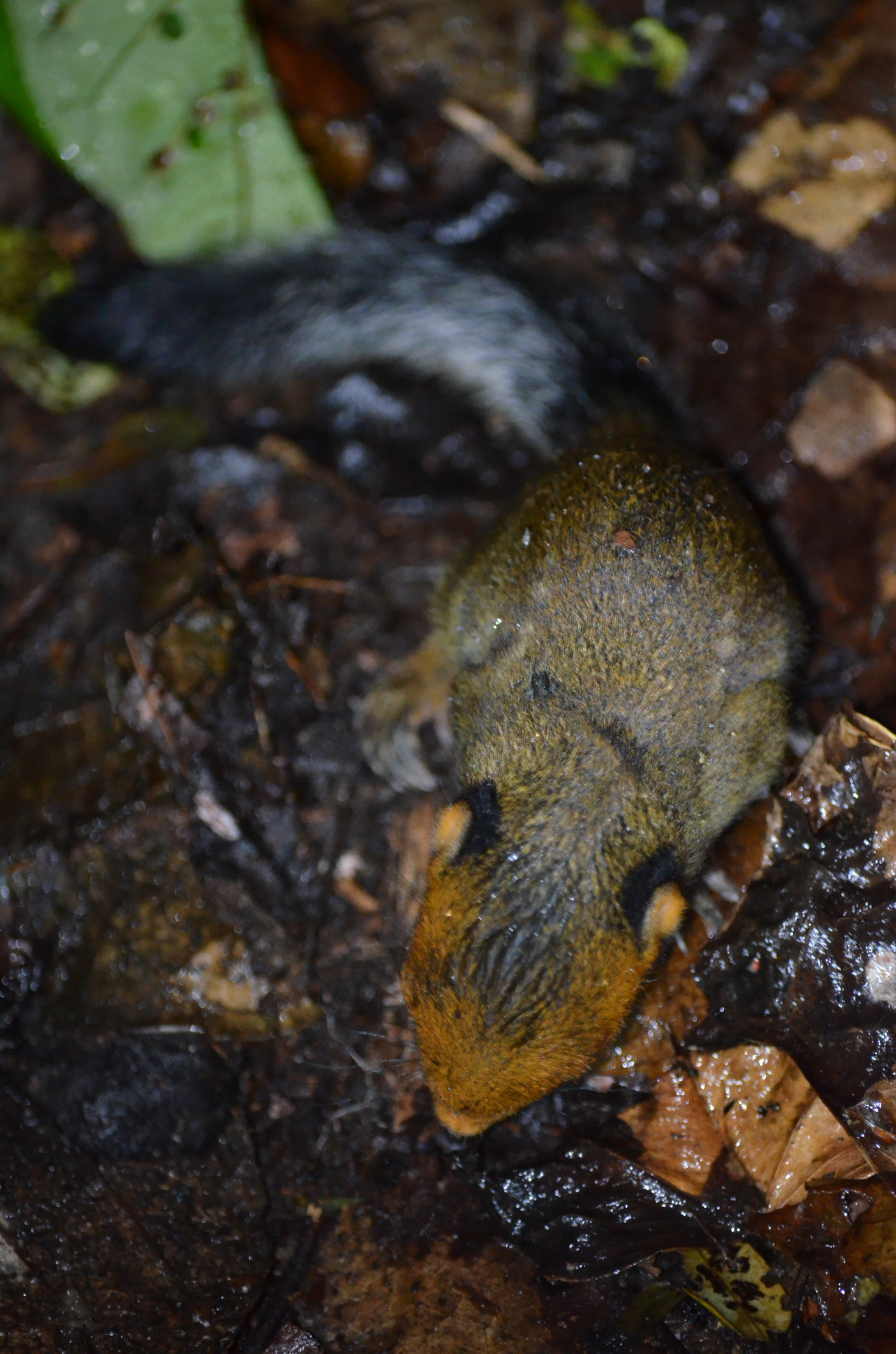

Conservation status
- Least Concern (IUCN 3.1)

Scientific classification
- Kingdom: Animalia
- Phylum: Chordata
- Class: Mammalia
- Order: Rodentia
- Family: Sciuridae
- Genus: Funisciurus
- Species: F. leucogenys

Binomial name
- Funisciurus leucogenys (Waterhouse, 1842)

Subspecies
- F. l. leucogenys; F. l. auriculatus; F. l. oliviae

= Red-cheeked rope squirrel =

Species of rodent

The red-cheeked rope squirrel (Funisciurus leucogenys) is a species of rodent in the family Sciuridae. It is found in Benin, Cameroon, Central African Republic, Equatorial Guinea, Ghana, Nigeria, and Togo. Its natural habitats are subtropical or tropical moist lowland forest and subtropical or tropical moist montane forest.
