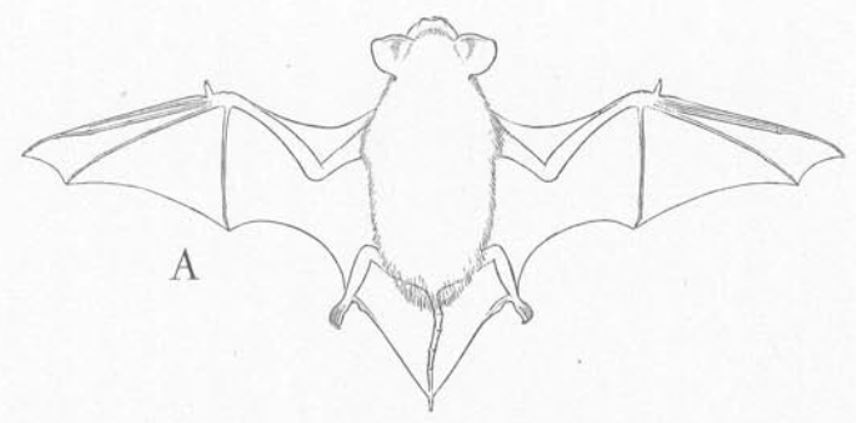
- Moloney's mimic bat (M. moloneyi)

Scientific classification
- Domain: Eukaryota
- Kingdom: Animalia
- Phylum: Chordata
- Class: Mammalia
- Order: Chiroptera
- Family: Vespertilionidae
- Tribe: Vespertilionini
- Genus: Mimetillus; Thomas, 1904

Type species
- Vesperugo (Vesperus) moloneyi Thomas, 1891

Species
- M. moloneyi M. thomasi

= Mimetillus =

Genus of bats

Mimetillus is a genus of vesper bat in the family Vespertilionidae. It contains two species, both known as mimic bats and found in sub-Saharan Africa.

There are two species in this genus:

- Moloney's mimic bat, Mimetillus moloneyi
- Thomas's mimic bat, Mimetillus thomasi

Previously, Mimetillus was thought to be a monotypic genus containing only M. moloneyi, but phylogenetic evidence has found M. thomasi to be a distinct species.
