= Ribboned rope squirrel =

Conservation status
- Least Concern (IUCN 3.1)

Scientific classification
- Kingdom: Animalia
- Phylum: Chordata
- Class: Mammalia
- Order: Rodentia
- Family: Sciuridae
- Genus: Funisciurus
- Species: F. lemniscatus

Binomial name
- Funisciurus lemniscatus (Le Conte, 1857)

Subspecies
- F. l. lemniscatus; F. l. mayumbicus

Species of rodent

The ribboned rope squirrel (Funisciurus lemniscatus) is a species of rodent in the family Sciuridae. It is found in Cameroon, Republic of the Congo, Democratic Republic of the Congo, and Equatorial Guinea. Its natural habitat is subtropical or tropical moist lowland forests.
