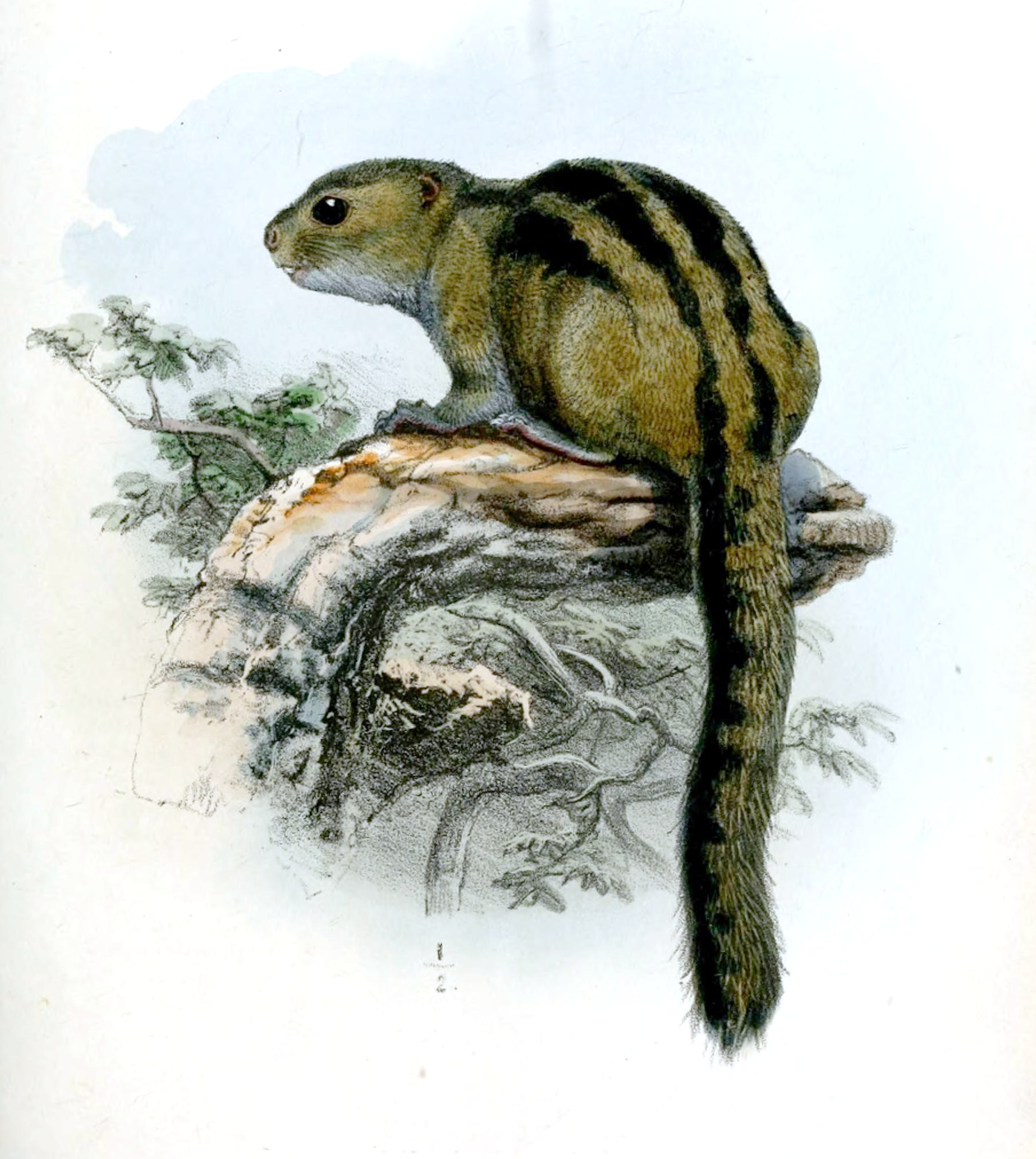
- Lady Burton's rope squirrel (Funisciurus isabella)

Scientific classification
- Kingdom: Animalia
- Phylum: Chordata
- Class: Mammalia
- Order: Rodentia
- Family: Sciuridae
- Subfamily: Xerinae
- Tribe: Protoxerini
- Genus: Funisciurus; Trouessart, 1880

Type species
- Sciurus isabella J. E. Gray, 1862

Species
- Funisciurus anerythrus; Funisciurus bayonii; Funisciurus carruthersi; Funisciurus congicus; Funisciurus duchaillui; Funisciurus isabella; Funisciurus lemniscatus; Funisciurus leucogenys; Funisciurus pyrropus; Funisciurus substriatus

= African striped squirrel =

Genus of rodents

African striped squirrels (genus Funisciurus), or rope squirrels, form a taxon of squirrels under the subfamily Xerinae and the tribe Protoxerini. They are only found in western and central Africa.

There are ten species in the genus:

- Thomas's rope squirrel (Funisciurus anerythrus)
- Lunda rope squirrel (Funisciurus bayonii)
- Carruther's mountain squirrel (Funisciurus carruthersi)
- Congo rope squirrel (Funisciurus congicus)
- Du Chaillu's rope squirrel (Funisciurus duchaillui)
- Lady Burton's rope squirrel (Funisciurus isabella)
- Ribboned rope squirrel (Funisciurus lemniscatus)
- Red-cheeked rope squirrel (Funisciurus leucogenys)
- Fire-footed rope squirrel (Funisciurus pyrropus)
- Kintampo rope squirrel (Funisciurus substriatus)

== Zoonoses ==
African striped squirrels have been implicated in the spread of human monkeypox in the Democratic Republic of the Congo. African striped squirrels were found to be a source of monkeypox in a 2003 Midwestern monkeypox outbreak.

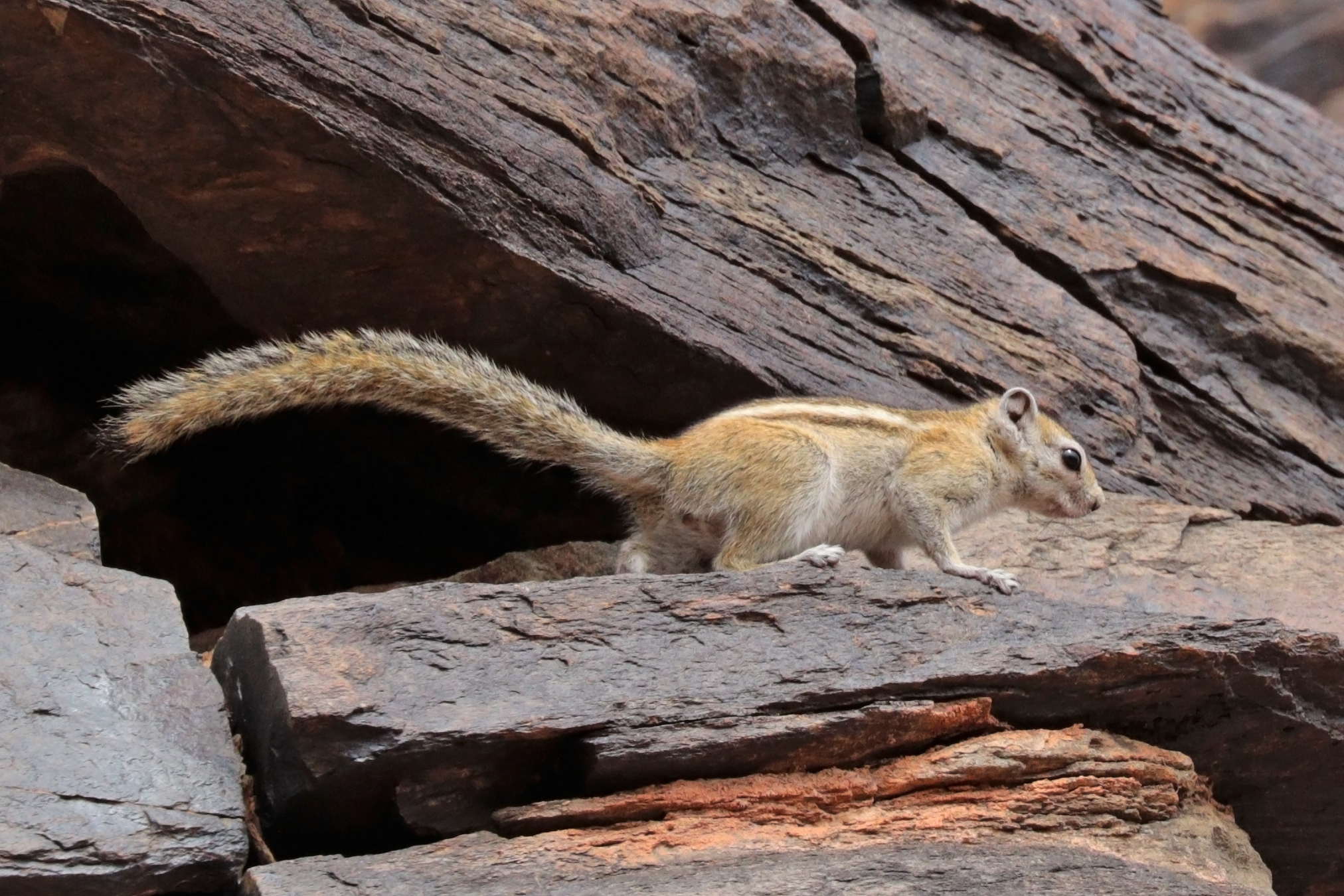
Congo rope squirrel photographed in Damaraland, Namibia.
