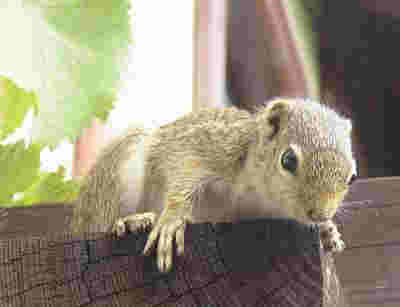
- Gambian sun squirrel (Heliosciurus gambianus)

Scientific classification
- Kingdom: Animalia
- Phylum: Chordata
- Class: Mammalia
- Order: Rodentia
- Family: Sciuridae
- Subfamily: Xerinae
- Tribe: Protoxerini; Moore, 1959

Genera
- Epixerus; Funisciurus; Heliosciurus; Myosciurus; Paraxerus; Protoxerus

= Protoxerini =

Tribe of rodents

The Protoxerini comprise a tribe of squirrels found in Africa. The 30 species in six genera are:

- Epixerus (monotypic) - Ebian's palm squirrel
- Funisciurus (nine species) - African striped squirrels
- Heliosciurus (six species) - sun squirrels
- Myosciurus (monotypic) - African pygmy squirrel
- Paraxerus (11 species) - African bush squirrels
- Protoxerus (two species) - African giant squirrels
