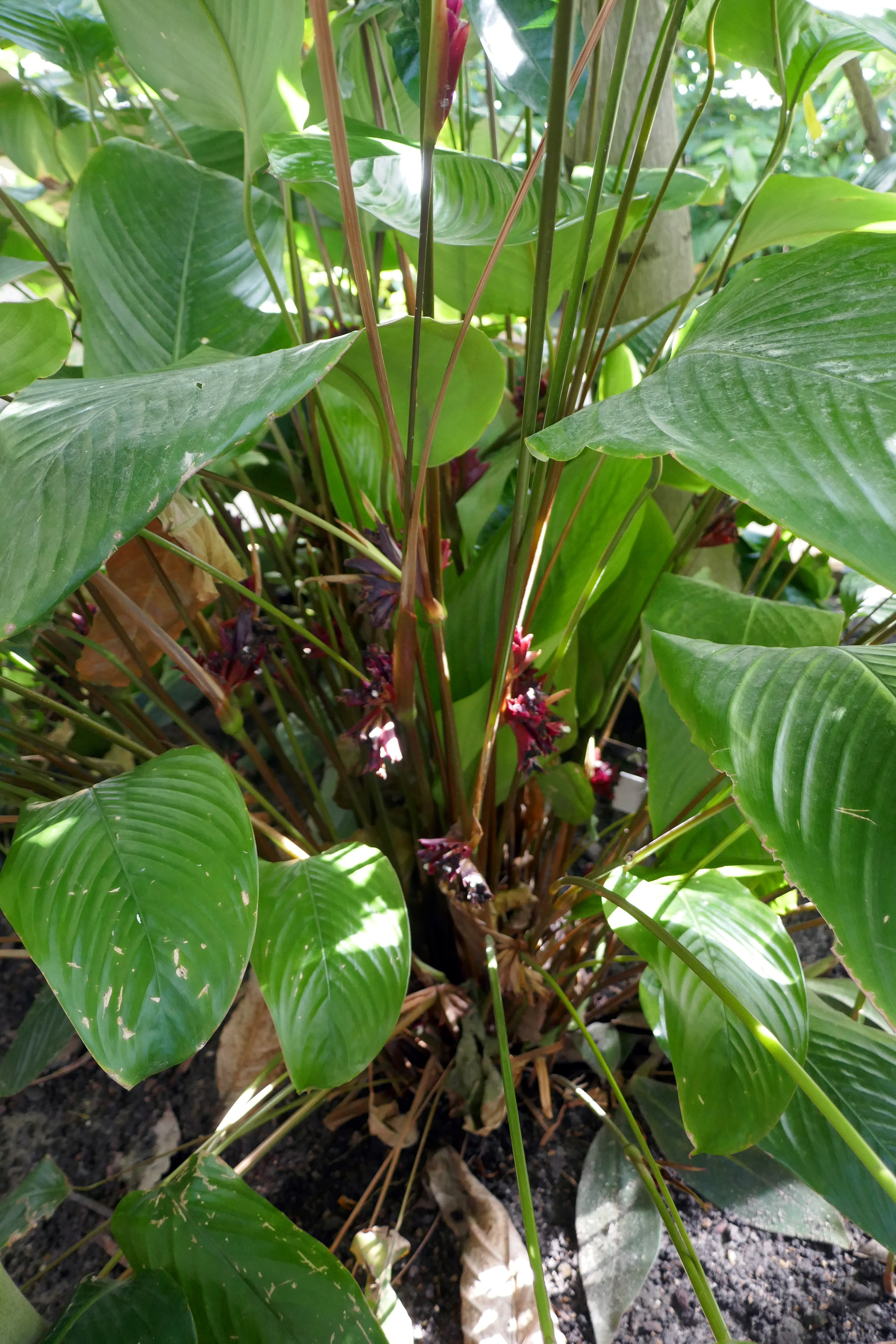

Scientific classification
- Kingdom: Plantae
- Clade: Tracheophytes
- Clade: Angiosperms
- Clade: Eudicots
- Clade: Rosids
- Order: Rosales
- Family: Moraceae
- Genus: Ficus
- Species: F. vallis-choudae

Binomial name
- Ficus vallis-choudae Delile

= Ficus vallis-choudae =

Species of flowering plant

Ficus vallis-choudae is a shrub or small to medium sized tree within the family Moraceae, in the genus Ficus and sub-genus, Sycomorus.

== Description ==
The species can grow up to 20 m in height, with a spreading crown, bark is pale brown to greyish in color, it has a fibrous slash exuding milky white latex; the branches tend to be pale brownish in color when mature and velvety when young. Leaves are broadly ovate in outline with a dentate margin, reaches 30 cm long and 24 cm wide with petioles present, both upper and lower surface of the leaves are smooth and glabrous. Single figs borne on leaf axils that sometimes reach up to 3 cm in diameter and are shortly pubescent.

== Ecology ==
In the forests of Uganda, black crested mangabeys and chimpanzees have been observed to eat the figs of the species. In Ivory Coast, bat species, Epomops buettikoferi and Micropteropus pusillus have been observed to also feed on the figs of Ficus vallis-choudae.

== Distribution and habitat ==
Occurs in West Africa from Guinea westwards to Sudan and southwards to Mozambique. Commonly found in swampy and gallery forest regions and woodlands, also can be spotted in grasslands.

== Uses ==
In parts of East Africa, the wood is used as material for furniture making and as a source of charcoal. Among the Biafada people, leaves are cooked and eaten as part of a vegetable sauce. Leaf and stem extracts are also used as part of a decoction to treat jaundice and gastro-intentinal conditions.

Figs are edible and eaten in parts of Cameroon.
