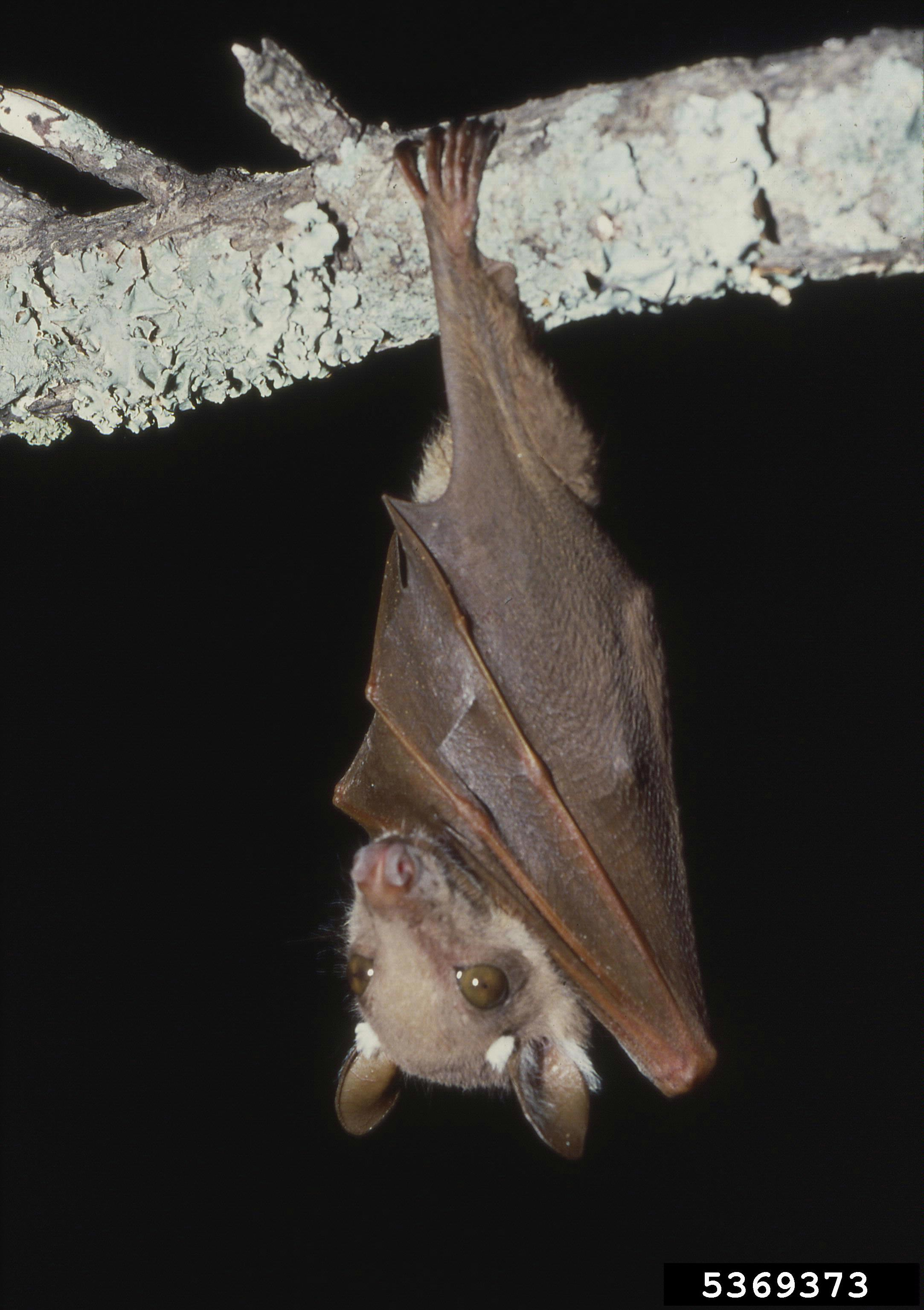

Scientific classification
- Domain: Eukaryota
- Kingdom: Animalia
- Phylum: Chordata
- Class: Mammalia
- Order: Chiroptera
- Family: Pteropodidae
- Subfamily: Epomophorinae

= Epomophorinae =

Subfamily of bats

Epomophorinae is a subfamily of megabat. It was established as a subfamily in 1997. Epomophorine bats are found only in Africa.

== Taxonomy ==
- Tribe Epomophorini
  - Epomophorus
  - Micropteropus
  - Hypsignathus
  - Epomops
  - Nanonycteris
- Tribe Myonycterini
  - Myonycteris
  - Lissonycteris
  - Megaloglossus
- Tribe Scotonycterini
  - Scotonycteris
  - Casinycteris
- Tribe Plerotini
  - Plerotes
