= Hayman's dwarf epauletted fruit bat =

Conservation status
- Data Deficient (IUCN 3.1)

Scientific classification
- Kingdom: Animalia
- Phylum: Chordata
- Class: Mammalia
- Order: Chiroptera
- Family: Pteropodidae
- Genus: Micropteropus
- Species: M. intermedius

Binomial name
- Micropteropus intermedius Hayman, 1963
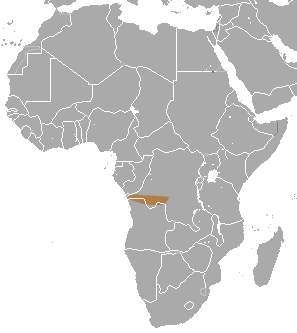
- Hayman's dwarf epauletted fruit bat range

Species of bat

Hayman's dwarf epauletted fruit bat or Hayman's epauletted fruit bat (Micropteropus intermedius) is a species of megabat in the family Pteropodidae. It is found in Angola and Democratic Republic of the Congo. Its natural habitats are subtropical or tropical moist lowland forest and moist savanna.
