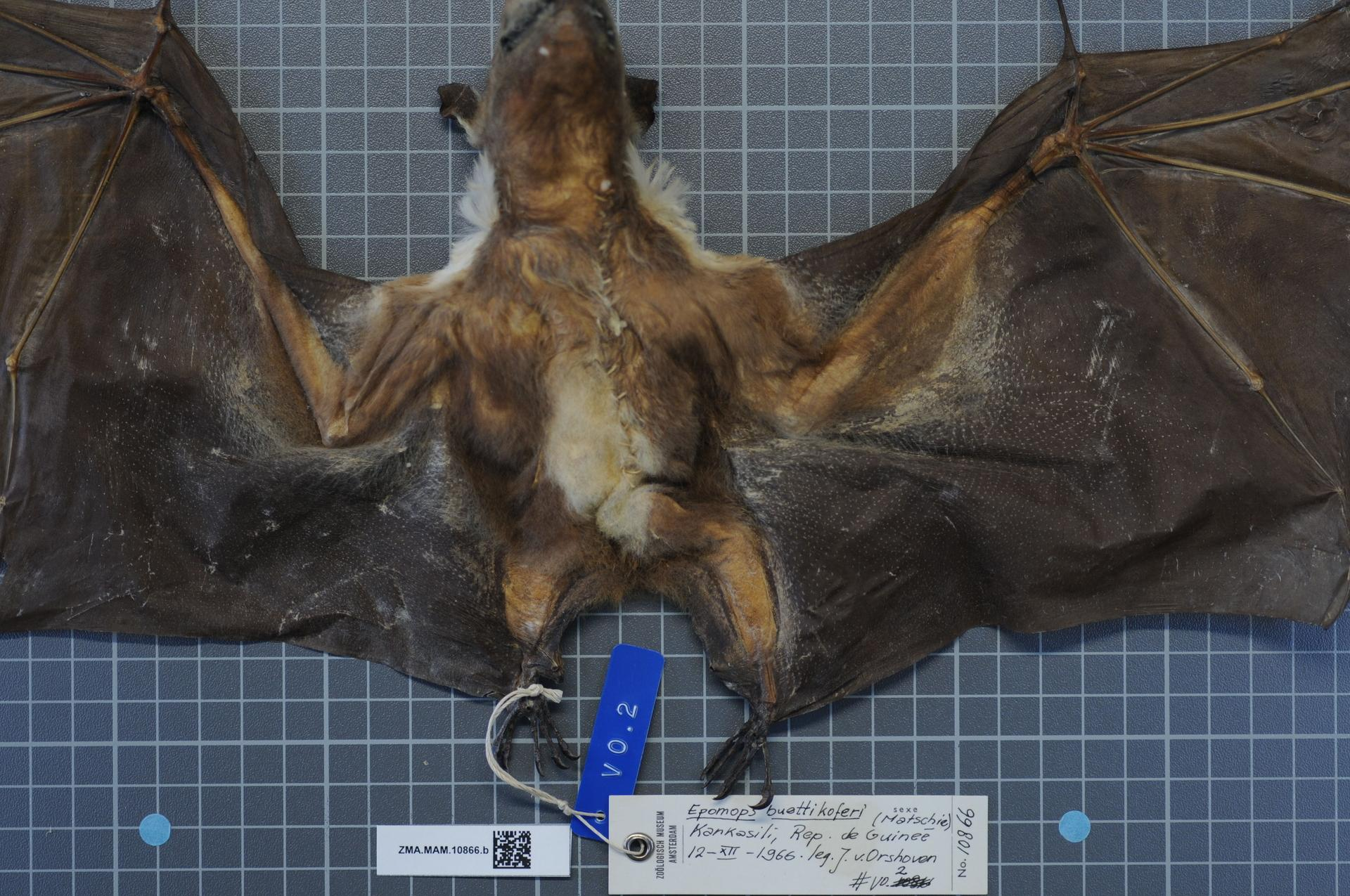

Conservation status
- Least Concern (IUCN 3.1)

Scientific classification
- Kingdom: Animalia
- Phylum: Chordata
- Class: Mammalia
- Order: Chiroptera
- Family: Pteropodidae
- Genus: Epomops
- Species: E. buettikoferi

Binomial name
- Epomops buettikoferi (Matschie, 1899)
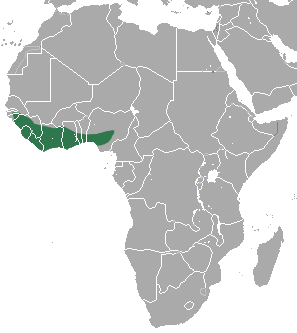
- Buettikofer's epauletted fruit bat range

Synonyms
- Epomophorus büttikoferi Matschie, 1899

= Buettikofer's epauletted fruit bat =

Species of mammal

Buettikofer's epauletted fruit bat (Epomops buettikoferi) is a species of megabat in the family Pteropodidae. It is found in Ivory Coast, Ghana, Guinea, Guinea-Bissau, Liberia, Nigeria, Senegal, and Sierra Leone. Its natural habitats are subtropical or tropical moist lowland forest and savanna.

== Taxonomy and etymology ==
It was described as a new species in 1899 by German zoologist Paul Matschie. Matschie placed it in the genus Epomophorus, naming it Epomophorus büttikoferi. The holotype was found in Schlieffelinsville, Liberia, along the Junk River. Matschie named the new species after Dr. Johann Büttikofer, who had conducted several scientific expeditions to Liberia. In 1965, Kuhn published that it was a subspecies of the Franquet's epauletted fruit bat (Epomops franqueti). This was refuted in 1975 by Bergmans, who reported that the Buettikofer's epauletted fruit bat differs significantly from Franquet's epauletted fruit bat in its morphology, warranting that they remain separate species.

This conclusion may be challenged again, however, as a 2016 study found that Franquet's epauletted fruit bat and Buettikofer's epauletted fruit bat were indistinguishable on the basis of mitochondrial DNA. The small genetic distance between the two taxa led the authors of the 2016 paper to assert that Epomops is monotypic, consisting of only Franquet's epauletted fruit bat, which is further divided into subspecies E. franqueti franqueti in Central Africa and E. franqueti buettikoferi in West Africa.

== Description ==
Males of this species weigh 164–198 g (0.362–0.437 lb), while females weigh 85–132 g (0.187–0.291 lb). While it is similar in appearance to Franquet's epauletted fruit bat, Buettikofer's epauletted fruit bat can be differentiated by its greater forearm, greater skull length, and longer first molar. Males have a forearm length greater than 91 mm (3.6 in) while females have a forearm length usually exceeding 86 mm (3.4 in). Greatest skull length in males is greater than 51 mm (2.0 in), while greatest skull length in females is greater than 45.8 mm (1.80 in).

== Biology ==
Free-ranging Buettikofer's epauletted fruit bats feed almost exclusively on fruit. The fruits of the Cape fig and Ficus vallischoudae comprised almost 50% of the diet of a population in Ivory Coast. Little is known about the reproduction of this species. It is possible that there are two breeding seasons per year, as pregnant females have been encountered in January and July. Juvenile individuals have been found in March and August. This hypothesis was supported by research on a population in Liberia, which had two breeding seasons per year. Births occurred in February–March and August–September, coinciding with the biannual wet seasons.

== Range and habitat ==
The Buettikofer's epauletted fruit bat overlaps with Franquet's epauletted fruit bat in the western part of its range. In its range to the west of Ghana, it is one of the most common species of its family encountered. While usually found in low-lying areas, it has been documented at elevations up to 1,200 m (3,900 ft) above sea level on Mount Nimba.

== Conservation ==
Buettikofer's epauletted fruit bat has been evaluated by the IUCN since 1994. From 1994–2004 it was listed as vulnerable; from 2004–present it has been least concern. While some of its habitat is within protected areas, it can thrive in areas that lack legal protection. It is hunted for bushmeat, though it is unclear what impact this has on its population numbers.
