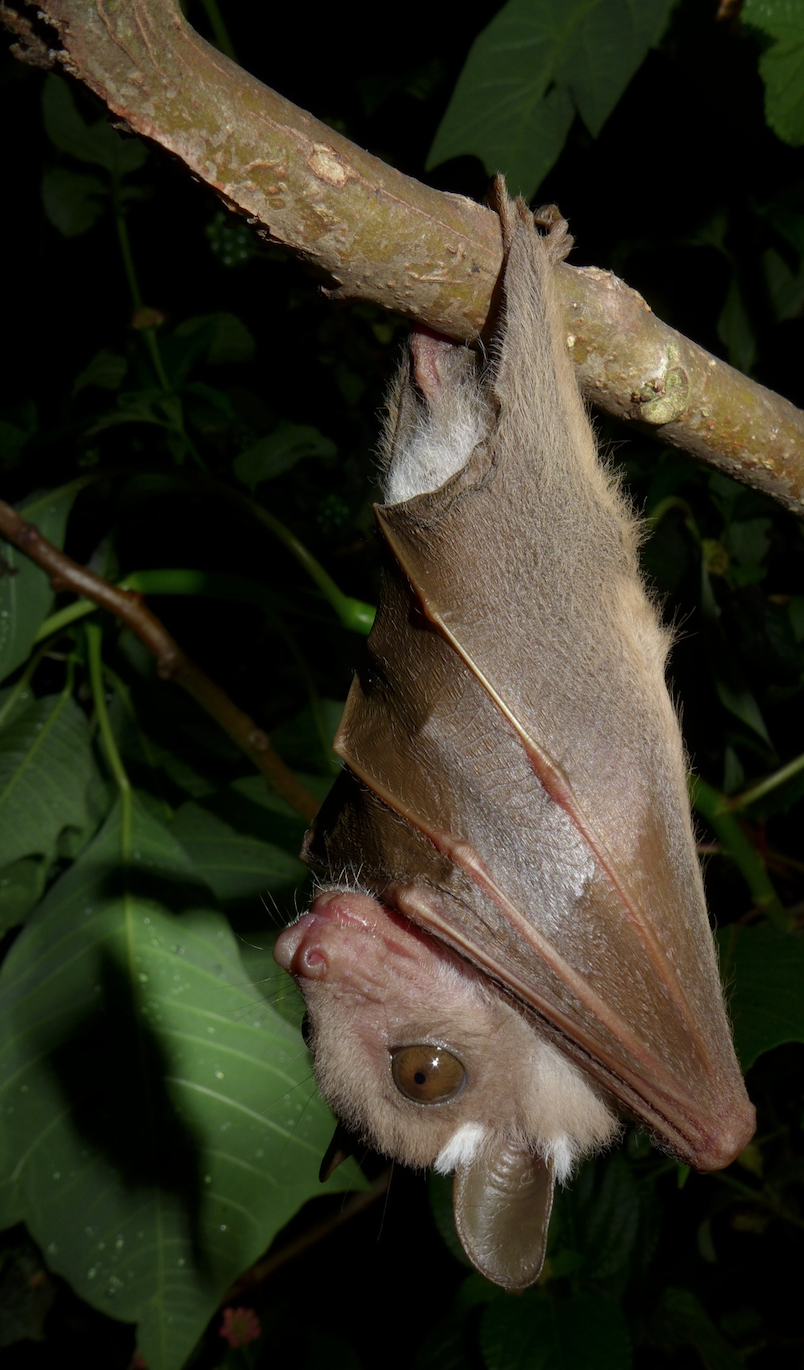
- Micropteropus

Scientific classification
- Kingdom: Animalia
- Phylum: Chordata
- Class: Mammalia
- Order: Chiroptera
- Family: Pteropodidae
- Subfamily: Epomophorinae
- Genus: Micropteropus; Matschie, 1899

Type species
- Epomophorus pusillus Peters, 1868

Species
- See text

= Micropteropus =

Genus of bats

Micropteropus (dwarf epauletted bat) is a genus of bat in the family Pteropodidae. It contains the following species:

- Hayman's dwarf epauletted fruit bat, Micropteropus intermedius
- Peters's dwarf epauletted fruit bat, Micropteropus pusillus
