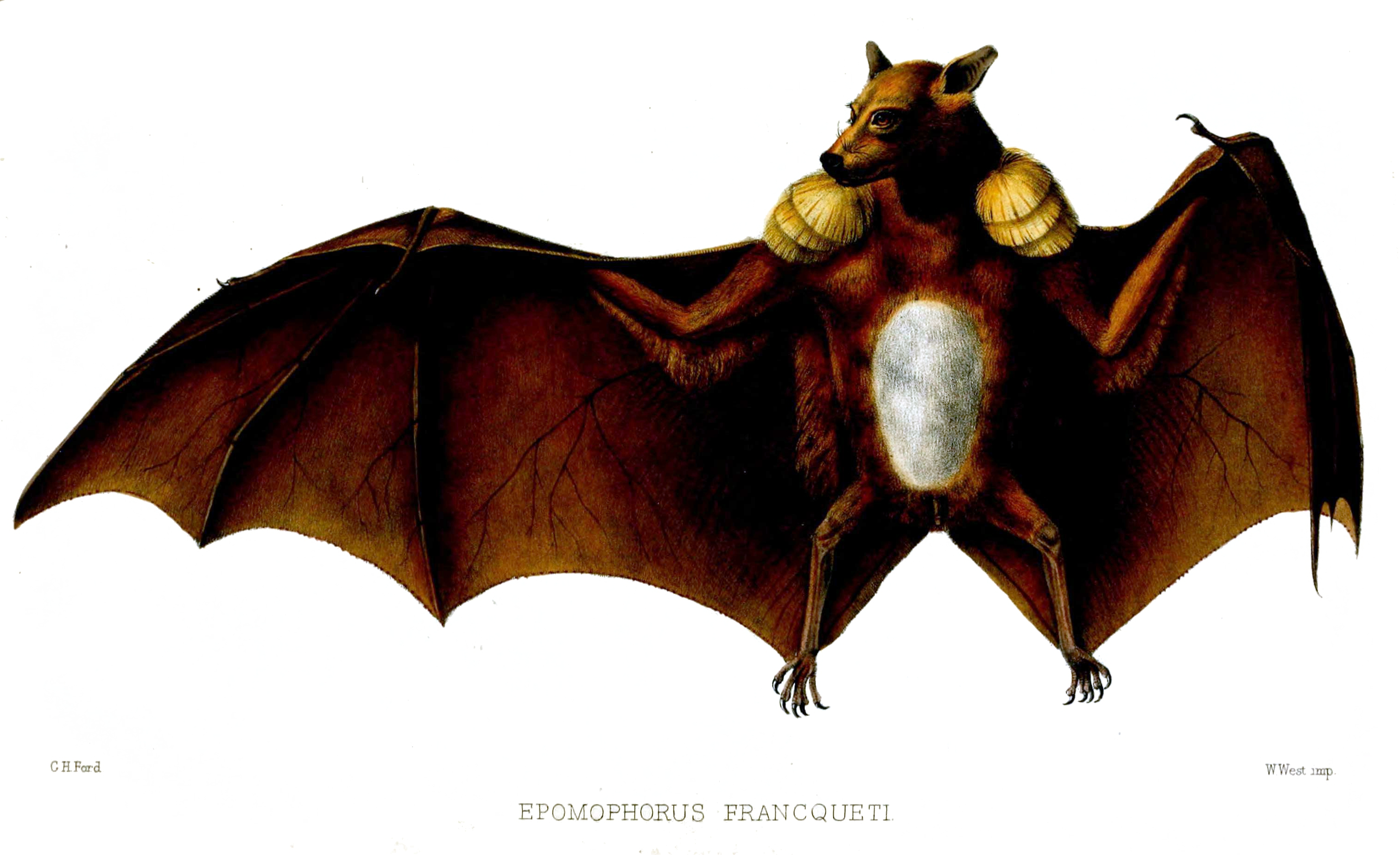
- Franquet's epauletted fruit bat (Epomops franqueti)

Scientific classification
- Domain: Eukaryota
- Kingdom: Animalia
- Phylum: Chordata
- Class: Mammalia
- Order: Chiroptera
- Family: Pteropodidae
- Subfamily: Epomophorinae
- Genus: Epomops; Gray, 1870

Type species
- Epomophorus franqueti Tomes, 1860

Species
- See text

= Epomops =

Genus of bats

Epomops is a genus of bat in the family Pteropodidae. It contains the following species:

- Buettikofer's epauletted fruit bat, Epomops buettikoferi
- Franquet's epauletted fruit bat, Epomops franqueti
