= List of mammals of Ethiopia =

This is a list of the mammal species recorded in Ethiopia. There are 279 mammal species in Ethiopia, of which five are critically endangered, eight are endangered, twenty-seven are vulnerable, and twelve are near threatened.

The following tags are used to highlight each species' conservation status as assessed by the International Union for Conservation of Nature:

EX	Extinct	No reasonable doubt that the last individual has died.
EW	Extinct in the wild	Known only to survive in captivity or as a naturalized populations well outside its previous range.
CR	Critically endangered	The species is in imminent risk of extinction in the wild.
EN	Endangered	The species is facing an extremely high risk of extinction in the wild.
VU	Vulnerable	The species is facing a high risk of extinction in the wild.
NT	Near threatened	The species does not meet any of the criteria that would categorise it as risking extinction but it is likely to do so in the future.
LC	Least concern	There are no current identifiable risks to the species.
DD	Data deficient	There is inadequate information to make an assessment of the risks to this species.

Some species were assessed using an earlier set of criteria. Species assessed using this system have the following instead of near threatened and least concern categories:

LR/cd	Lower risk/conservation dependent	Species which were the focus of conservation programmes and may have moved into a higher risk category if that programme was discontinued.
LR/nt	Lower risk/near threatened	Species which are close to being classified as vulnerable but are not the subject of conservation programmes.
LR/lc	Lower risk/least concern	Species for which there are no identifiable risks.

== Order: Macroscelidea (elephant shrews) ==
Often called sengis, the elephant shrews or jumping shrews are native to southern Africa. Their common English name derives from their elongated flexible snout and their resemblance to the true shrews.

- Family: Macroscelididae (elephant-shrews)
  - Genus: Elephantulus
    - Rufous elephant shrew, E. rufescens LC

== Order: Tubulidentata (aardvarks) ==
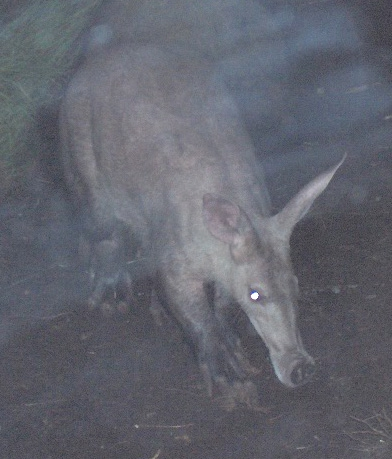
Aardvark

The order Tubulidentata consists of a single species, the aardvark. Tubulidentata are characterised by their teeth which lack a pulp cavity and form thin tubes which are continuously worn down and replaced.

- Family: Orycteropodidae
  - Genus: Orycteropus
    - Aardvark, O. afer LC

== Order: Hyracoidea (hyraxes) ==
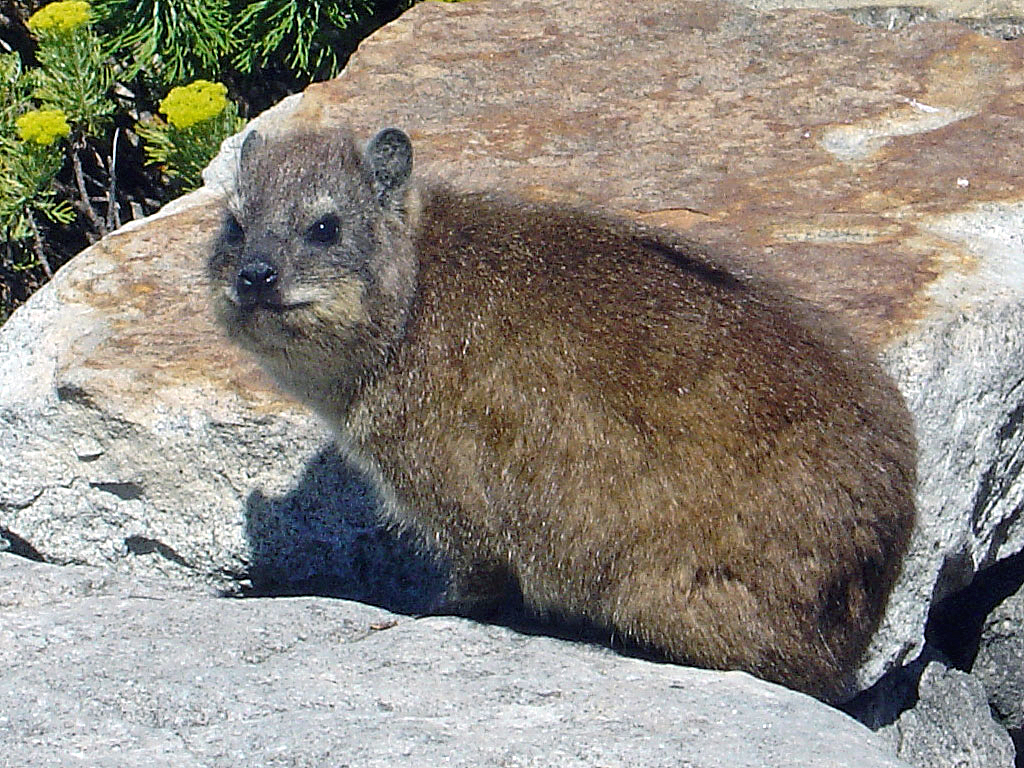
Cape hyrax

The hyraxes are any of four species of fairly small, thickset, herbivorous mammals in the order Hyracoidea. About the size of a domestic cat they are well-furred, with rounded bodies and a stumpy tail. They are native to Africa and the Middle East.

- Family: Procaviidae (hyraxes)
  - Genus: Heterohyrax
    - Yellow-spotted rock hyrax, Heterohyrax brucei LC
  - Genus: Procavia
    - Cape hyrax, Procavia capensis LC

== Order: Proboscidea (elephants) ==
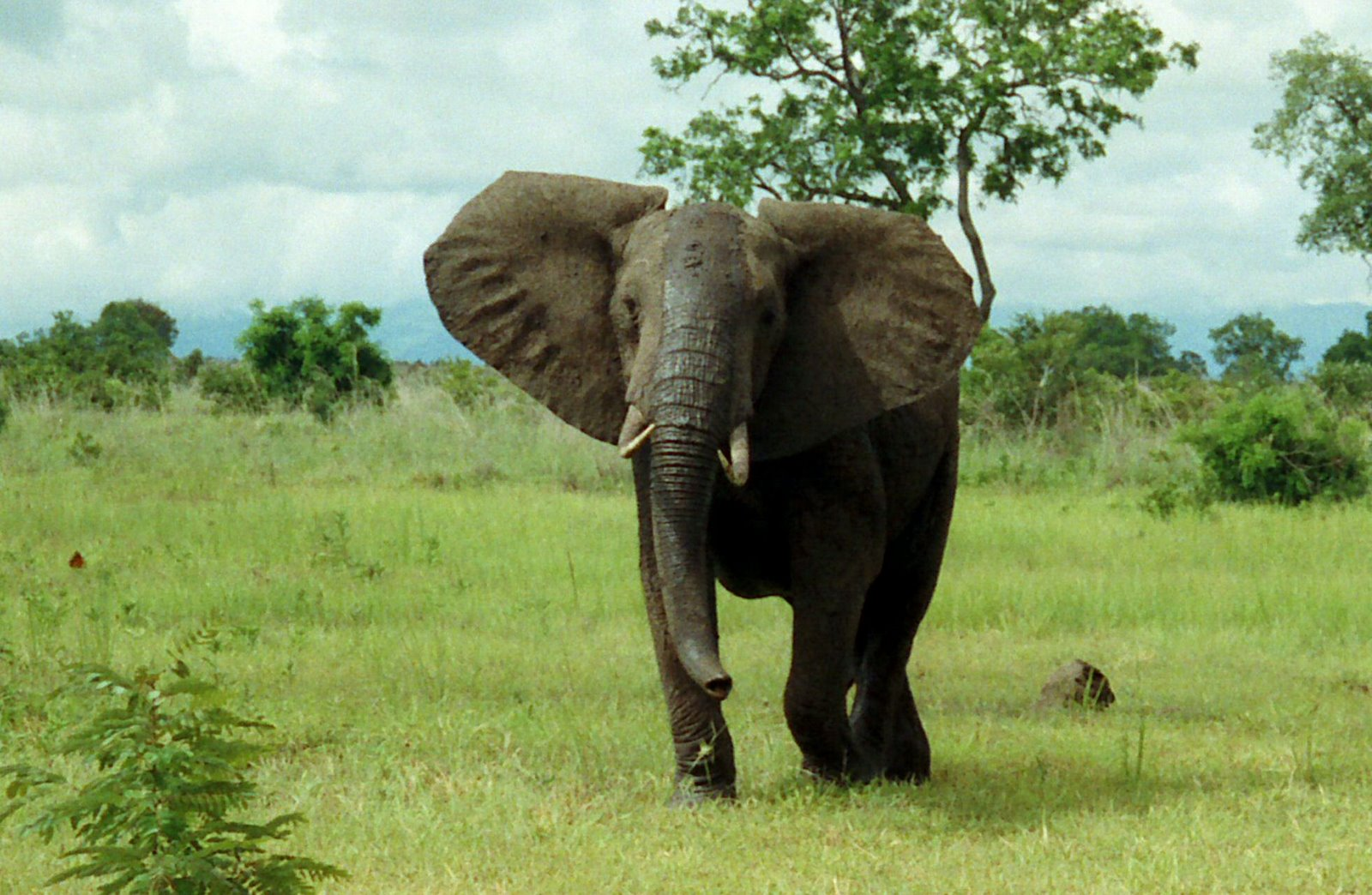
African bush elephant

The elephants comprise three living species and are the largest living land animals.

- Family: Elephantidae (elephants)
  - Genus: Loxodonta
    - African bush elephant, L. africana EN
      - L. a. orleansi CR

== Order: Primates ==
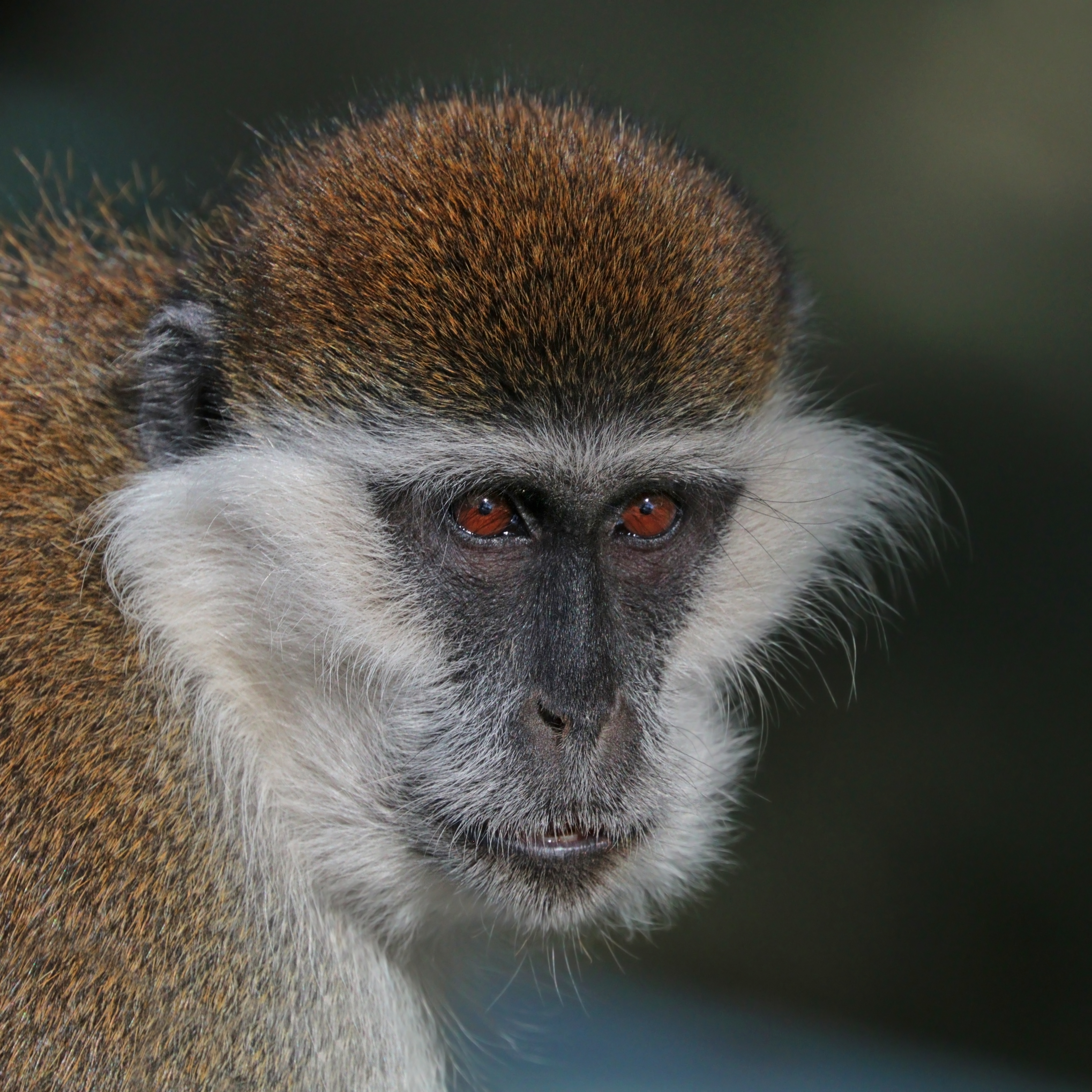
Grivet monkey

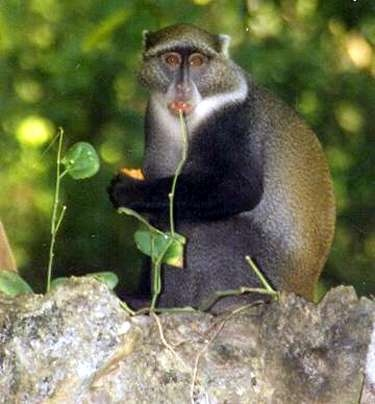
Blue monkey

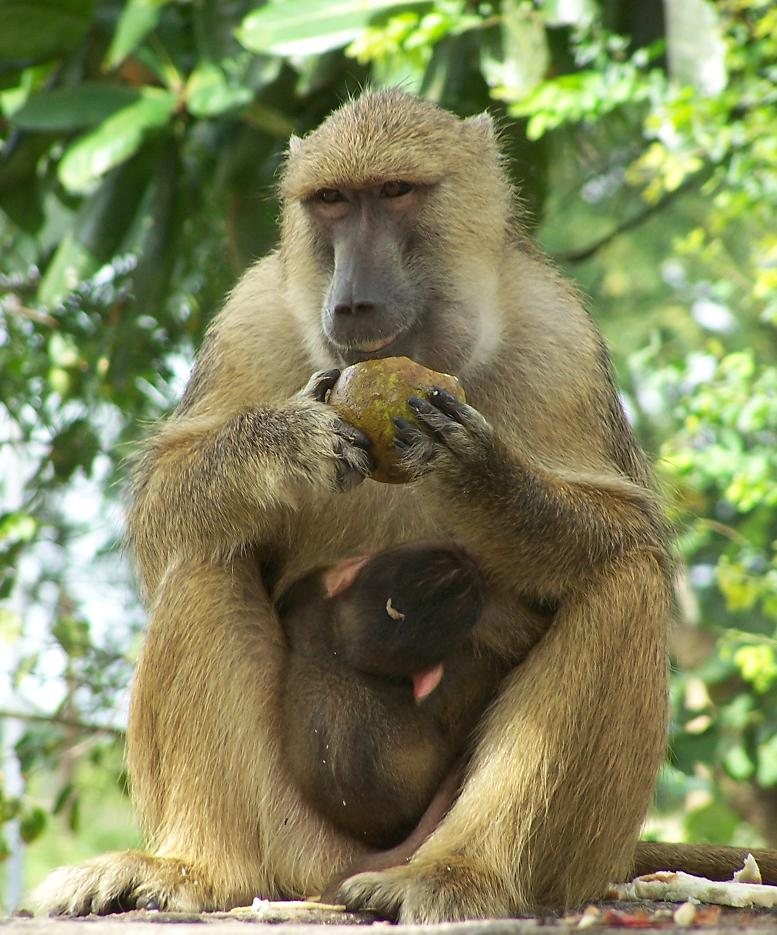
Yellow baboon

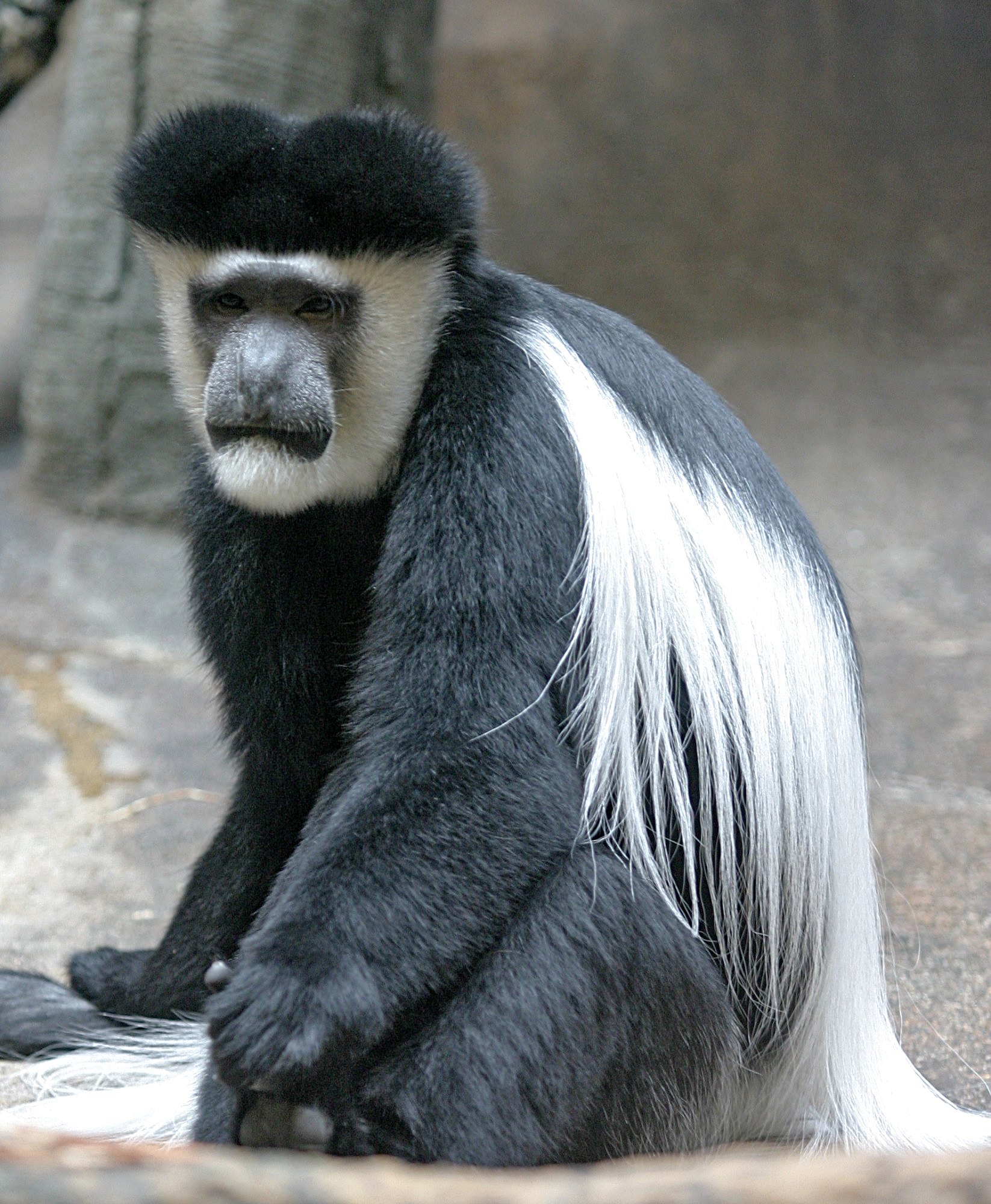
Mantled guereza

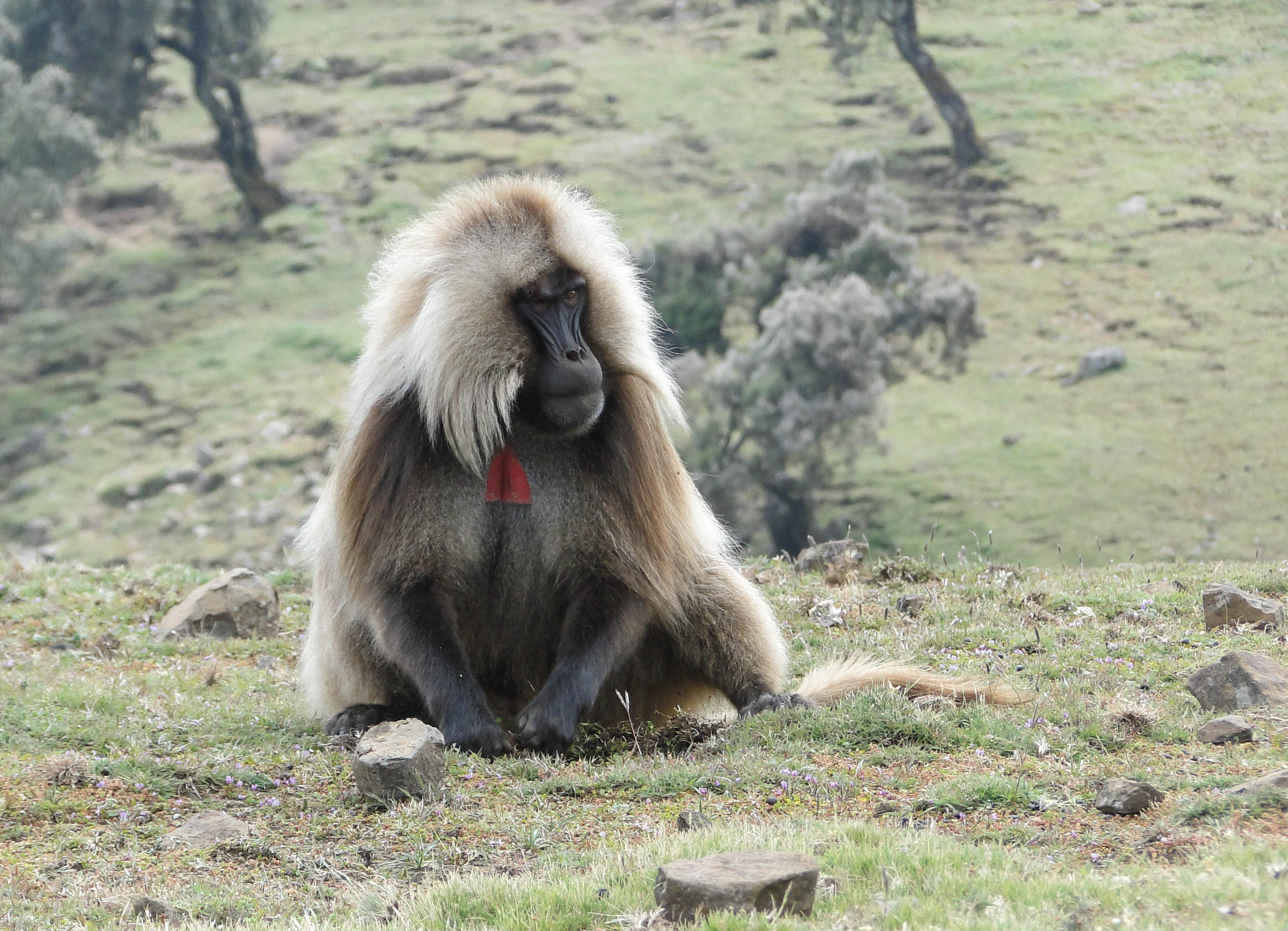
Gelada

The order Primates contains humans and their closest relatives: lemurs, lorisoids, tarsiers, monkeys, and apes.

- Suborder: Strepsirrhini
  - Infraorder: Lemuriformes
    - Superfamily: Lorisoidea
      - Family: Galagidae
        - Genus: Galago
          - Somali bushbaby, Galago gallarum LR/nt
          - Senegal bushbaby, Galago senegalensis LR/lc
- Suborder: Haplorhini
  - Infraorder: Simiiformes
    - Parvorder: Catarrhini
      - Superfamily: Cercopithecoidea
        - Family: Cercopithecidae (Old World monkeys)
          - Genus: Erythrocebus
            - Patas monkey, Erythrocebus patas LR/lc
          - Genus: Chlorocebus
            - Grivet, Chlorocebus aethiops LR/lc
            - Vervet monkey, Chlorocebus pygerythrus LR/lc
            - Bale Mountains vervet, Chlorocebus djamdjamensis VU
          - Genus: Cercopithecus
            - Blue monkey, Cercopithecus mitis LR/lc
              - Boutourlini's blue monkey Cercopithecus mitis boutourlinii VU
            - De Brazza's monkey, Cercopithecus neglectus LR/lc
          - Genus: Papio
            - Olive baboon, Papio anubis LR/lc
            - Yellow baboon, Papio cynocephalus LR/lc
            - Hamadryas baboon, Papio hamadryas LR/nt
          - Genus: Theropithecus
            - Gelada, Theropithecus gelada LR/nt
          - Subfamily: Colobinae
            - Genus: Colobus
              - Mantled guereza, Colobus guereza LR/lc

== Order: Rodentia (rodents) ==
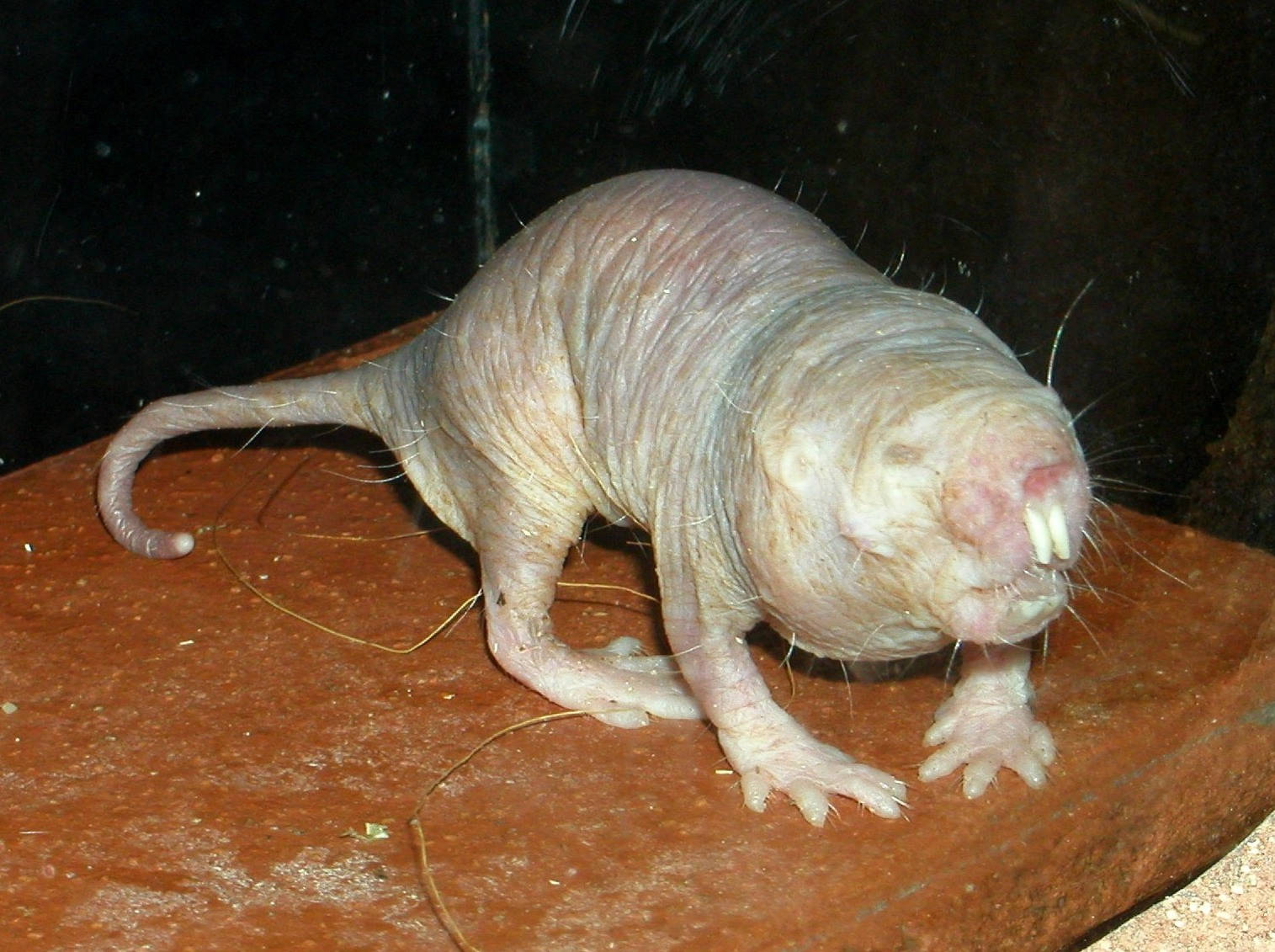
Naked mole rat

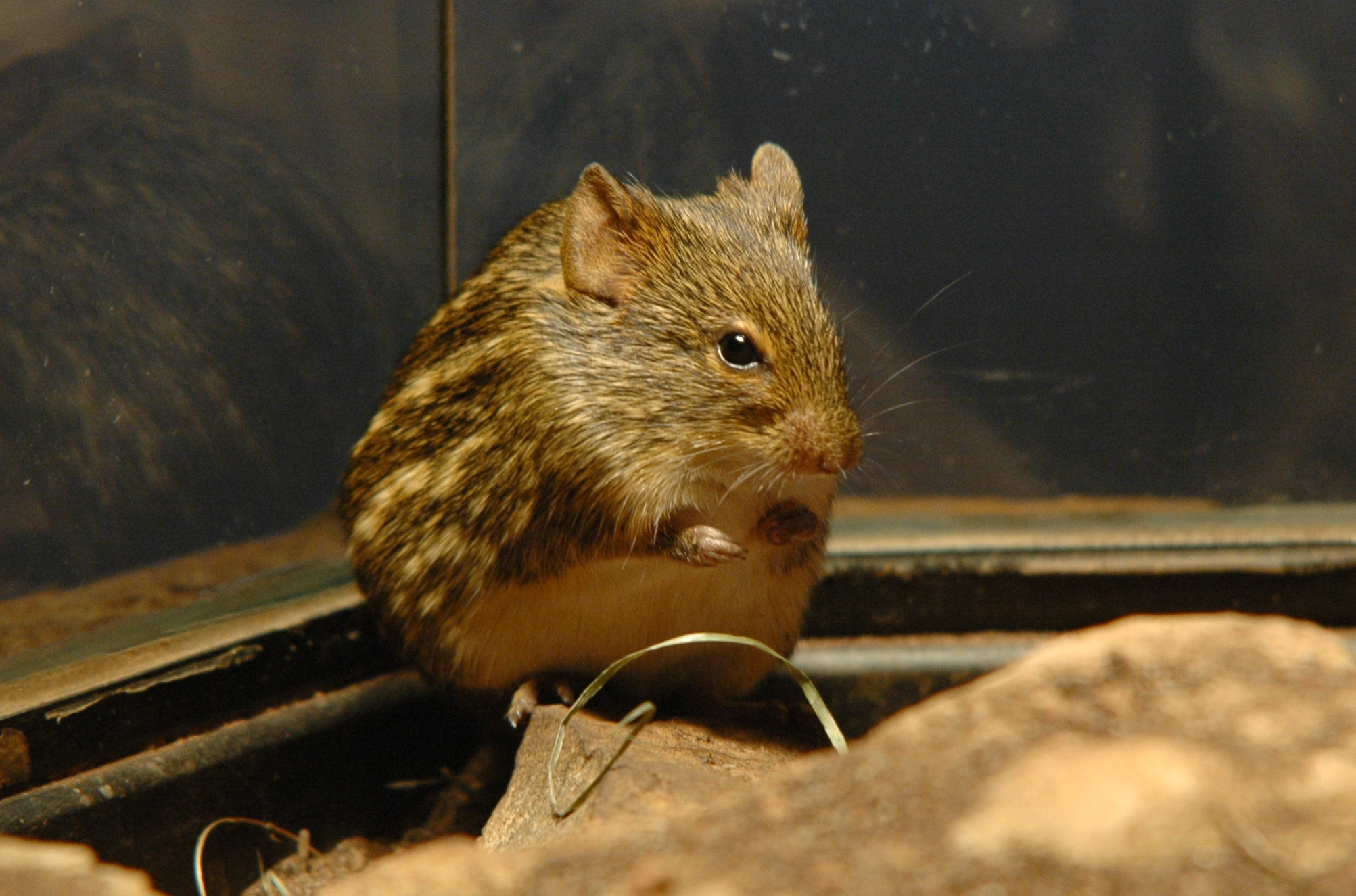
Typical striped grass mouse

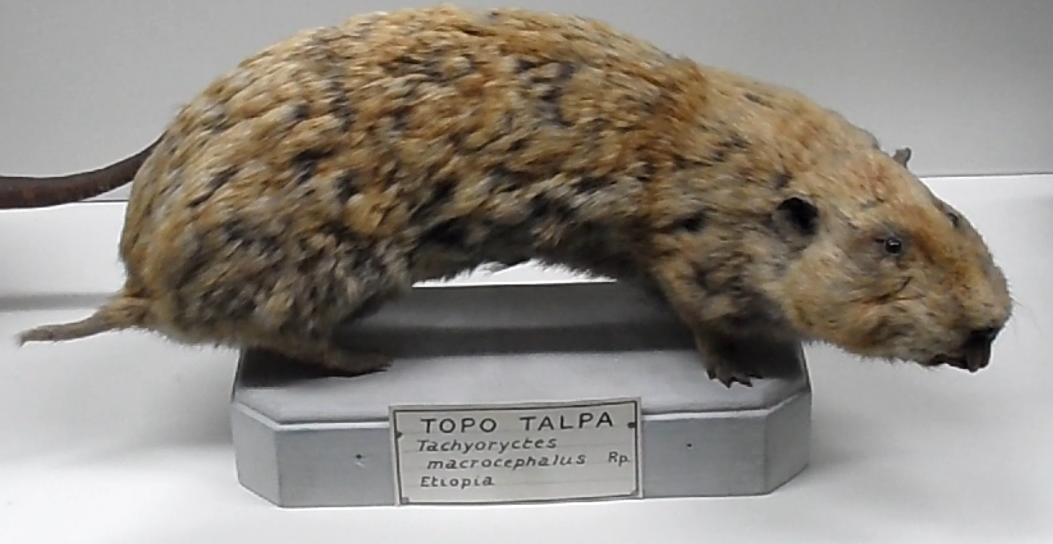
Giant mole-rat

Rodents make up the largest order of mammals, with over 40% of mammalian species. They have two incisors in the upper and lower jaw which grow continually and must be kept short by gnawing. Most rodents are small though the capybara can weigh up to 45 kg (99 lb).

- Suborder: Hystricognathi
  - Family: Bathyergidae
    - Genus: Heterocephalus
      - Naked mole-rat, Heterocephalus glaber LC
  - Family: Hystricidae (Old World porcupines)
    - Genus: Hystrix
      - Crested porcupine, Hystrix cristata LC
  - Family: Thryonomyidae (cane rats)
    - Genus: Thryonomys
      - Lesser cane rat, Thryonomys gregorianus LC
- Suborder: Sciurognathi
  - Family: Sciuridae (squirrels)
    - Subfamily: Xerinae
      - Tribe: Xerini
        - Genus: Xerus
          - Striped ground squirrel, Xerus erythropus LC
          - Unstriped ground squirrel, Xerus rutilus LC
      - Tribe: Protoxerini
        - Genus: Heliosciurus
          - Gambian sun squirrel, Heliosciurus gambianus LC
  - Family: Gliridae (dormice)
    - Subfamily: Graphiurinae
      - Genus: Graphiurus
        - Small-eared dormouse, Graphiurus microtis LC
  - Family: Spalacidae
    - Subfamily: Tachyoryctinae
      - Genus: Tachyoryctes
        - Big-headed African mole-rat, Tachyoryctes macrocephalus EN
        - Northeast African mole-rat, Tachyoryctes splendens LC
  - Family: Nesomyidae
    - Subfamily: Dendromurinae
      - Genus: Dendromus
        - Lovat's climbing mouse, Dendromus lovati VU
        - Gray climbing mouse, Dendromus melanotis LC
        - Chestnut climbing mouse, Dendromus mystacalis LC
      - Genus: Megadendromus
        - Nikolaus's mouse, Megadendromus nikolausi DD
      - Genus: Steatomys
        - Tiny fat mouse, Steatomys parvus LC
    - Subfamily: Cricetomyinae
      - Genus: Saccostomus
        - Mearns's pouched mouse, Saccostomus mearnsi LC
  - Family: Cricetidae
    - Subfamily: Lophiomyinae
      - Genus: Lophiomys
        - Maned rat, Lophiomys imhausi LC
  - Family: Muridae (mice, rats, voles, gerbils, hamsters, etc.)
    - Subfamily: Deomyinae
      - Genus: Acomys
        - Cairo spiny mouse, Acomys cahirinus LC
        - Gray spiny mouse, Acomys cineraceus LC
        - Louise's spiny mouse, Acomys louisae LC
        - Mullah spiny mouse, Acomys mullah LC
        - Wilson's spiny mouse, Acomys wilsoni LC
      - Genus: Lophuromys
        - Short-tailed brush-furred rat, Lophuromys brevicaudus NT
        - Ethiopian forest brush-furred rat, Lophuromys chrysopus NT
        - Yellow-spotted brush-furred rat, Lophuromys flavopunctatus LC
        - Black-clawed brush-furred rat, Lophuromys melanonyx VU
      - Genus: Uranomys
        - Rudd's mouse, Uranomys ruddi LC
    - Subfamily: Otomyinae
      - Genus: Otomys
        - Cheesman's vlei rat, Otomys cheesmani CR
        - Charada vlei rat, Otomys fortior VU
        - Heller's vlei rat, Otomys helleri LC
        - Simien vlei rat, Otomys simiensis LC
        - Ethiopian vlei rat, Otomys typus LC
        - Yalden's vlei rat, Otomys yaldeni VU
    - Subfamily: Gerbillinae
      - Genus: Ammodillus
        - Ammodile, Ammodillus imbellis DD
      - Genus: Gerbillus
        - Somalia gerbil, Gerbillus dunni DD
        - Cushioned gerbil, Gerbillus pulvinatus LC
        - Least gerbil, Gerbillus ruberrimus LC
      - Genus: Tatera
        - Kemp's gerbil, Tatera kempi LC
        - Black-tailed gerbil, Tatera nigricauda LC
        - Phillips's gerbil, Tatera phillipsi LC
        - Fringe-tailed gerbil, Tatera robusta LC
        - Savanna gerbil, Tatera valida LC
      - Genus: Taterillus
        - Emin's gerbil, Taterillus emini LC
        - Harrington's gerbil, Taterillus harringtoni LC
    - Subfamily: Murinae
      - Genus: Aethomys
        - Hinde's rock rat, Aethomys hindei LC
      - Genus: Arvicanthis
        - Abyssinian grass rat, Arvicanthis abyssinicus LC
        - Blick's grass rat, Arvicanthis blicki NT
        - Nairobi grass rat, Arvicanthis nairobae LC
        - African grass rat, Arvicanthis niloticus LC
        - Neumann's grass rat, Arvicanthis neumanni DD
      - Genus: Dasymys
        - African marsh rat, Dasymys incomtus LC
      - Genus: Desmomys
        - Harrington's rat, Desmomys harringtoni LC
        - Yalden's rat, Desmomys yaldeni EN
      - Genus: Grammomys
        - Macmillan's thicket rat, Grammomys macmillani LC
        - Ethiopian thicket rat, Grammomys minnae VU
      - Genus: Lemniscomys
        - Buffoon striped grass mouse, Lemniscomys macculus LC
        - Typical striped grass mouse, Lemniscomys striatus LC
        - Heuglin's striped grass mouse, Lemniscomys zebra LC
      - Genus: Mastomys
        - Awash multimammate mouse, Mastomys awashensis VU
        - Guinea multimammate mouse, Mastomys erythroleucus LC
        - Natal multimammate mouse, Mastomys natalensis LC
      - Genus: Muriculus
        - Ethiopian striped mouse, Muriculus imberbis EN
      - Genus: Mus
        - Mahomet mouse, Mus mahomet LC
        - Peters's mouse, Mus setulosus LC
        - Delicate mouse, Mus tenellus LC
      - Genus: Mylomys
        - Ethiopian mylomys, Mylomys rex DD
      - Genus: Myomyscus
        - Brockman's rock mouse, Myomyscus brockmani LC
      - Genus: Nilopegamys
        - Ethiopian amphibious rat, Nilopegamys plumbeus CR
      - Genus: Oenomys
        - Common rufous-nosed rat, Oenomys hypoxanthus LC
      - Genus: Stenocephalemys
        - Ethiopian white-footed mouse, Stenocephalemys albipes LC
        - Ethiopian narrow-headed rat, Stenocephalemys albocaudata NT
        - Gray-tailed narrow-headed rat, Stenocephalemys griseicauda NT
        - Rupp's mouse, Stenocephalemys ruppi DD
      - Genus: Thallomys
        - Acacia rat, Thallomys paedulcus LC
  - Family: Ctenodactylidae
    - Genus: Pectinator
      - Speke's pectinator, Pectinator spekei DD

== Order: Lagomorpha (lagomorphs) ==
The lagomorphs comprise two families, Leporidae with hares and rabbits, and Ochotonidae with pikas. Though they can resemble rodents, and were classified as a superfamily in that order until the early 20th century, they have since been considered a separate order. They differ from rodents in a number of physical characteristics, such as having four incisors in the upper jaw rather than two.

- Family: Leporidae
  - Genus: Lepus
    - Cape hare, Lepus capensis LC
    - Ethiopian hare, Lepus fagani LC
    - Abyssinian hare, Lepus habessinicus LC
    - African savanna hare, Lepus microtis LC
    - Ethiopian highland hare, Lepus starcki LC

== Order: Eulipotyphla (shrews, moles, hedgehogs and gymnures) ==
The order Eulipotyphla constitutes four families, two of which are found in Ethiopia. The Soricidae family are made up of shrews, whilst the Erinaceidae family are composed of the hedgehogs and gymnures. Hedgehogs are easily recognised by their spines whilst the shrews are more rat-like in appearance.

- Family: Erinaceidae (hedgehogs)
  - Subfamily: Erinaceinae
    - Genus: Atelerix
      - Four-toed hedgehog, Atelerix albiventris LR/lc
    - Genus: Hemiechinus
      - Desert hedgehog, Hemiechinus aethiopicus LR/lc
- Family: Soricidae (shrews)
  - Subfamily: Crocidurinae
    - Genus: Crocidura
      - Bailey's shrew, Crocidura baileyi NT
      - Bottego's shrew, Crocidura bottegi DD
      - Bale shrew, Crocidura bottegoides EN
      - African dusky shrew, Crocidura caliginea LC
      - Savanna shrew, Crocidura fulvastra LC
      - Bicolored musk shrew, Crocidura fuscomurina LC
      - Glass's shrew, Crocidura glassi VU
      - Harenna shrew, Crocidura harenna CR
      - Hildegarde's shrew, Crocidura hildegardeae LC
      - Lucina's shrew, Crocidura lucina VU
      - Mauritanian shrew, Crocidura lusitania LC
      - MacMillan's shrew, Crocidura macmillani VU
      - Somali dwarf shrew, Crocidura nana DD
      - African black shrew, Crocidura nigrofusca LC
      - Niobe's shrew, Crocidura niobe LC
      - African giant shrew, Crocidura olivieri LC
      - Small-footed shrew, Crocidura parvipes LC
      - Sahelian tiny shrew, Crocidura pasha LC
      - Guramba shrew, Crocidura phaeura VU
      - Flat-headed shrew, Crocidura planiceps DD
      - Desert musk shrew, Crocidura smithii LC
      - Somali shrew, Crocidura somalica LC
      - Thalia's shrew, Crocidura thalia LC
      - Savanna path shrew, Crocidura viaria LC
      - Voi shrew, Crocidura voi LC
      - Yankari shrew, Crocidura yankariensis LC
      - Zaphir's shrew, Crocidura zaphiri DD
    - Genus: Suncus
      - Etruscan shrew, Suncus etruscus LC
    - Genus: Sylvisorex
      - Climbing shrew, Sylvisorex megalura LC

== Order: Chiroptera (bats) ==
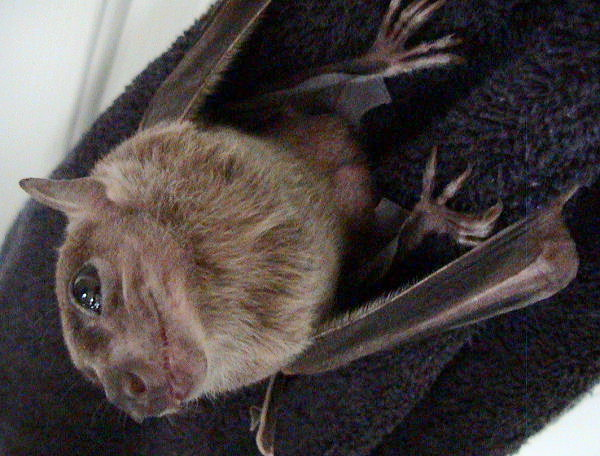
Egyptian fruit bat

The bats' most distinguishing feature is that their forelimbs are developed as wings, making them the only mammals capable of flight. Bat species account for about 20% of all mammals.

- Family: Pteropodidae (flying foxes, Old World fruit bats)
  - Subfamily: Pteropodinae
    - Genus: Eidolon
      - Straw-coloured fruit bat, Eidolon helvum LC
    - Genus: Epomophorus
      - Gambian epauletted fruit bat, Epomophorus gambianus LC
      - Ethiopian epauletted fruit bat, Epomophorus labiatus LC
      - East African epauletted fruit bat, Epomophorus minimus LC
    - Genus: Hypsignathus
      - Hammer-headed bat, Hypsignathus monstrosus LC
    - Genus: Lissonycteris
      - Lissonycteris angolensis LC
    - Genus: Micropteropus
      - Peters's dwarf epauletted fruit bat, Micropteropus pusillus LC
    - Genus: Rousettus
      - Egyptian fruit bat, Rousettus aegyptiacus LC
      - Long-haired rousette, Rousettus lanosus LC
- Family: Vespertilionidae
  - Subfamily: Kerivoulinae
    - Genus: Kerivoula
      - Ethiopian woolly bat, Kerivoula eriophora DD
      - Lesser woolly bat, Kerivoula lanosa LC
  - Subfamily: Myotinae
    - Genus: Myotis
      - Rufous mouse-eared bat, Myotis bocagii LC
      - Morris's bat, Myotis morrisi VU
      - Scott's mouse-eared bat, Myotis scotti VU
      - Cape hairy bat, Myotis tricolor LC
      - Welwitsch's bat, Myotis welwitschii LC
  - Subfamily: Vespertilioninae
    - Genus: Glauconycteris
      - Butterfly bat, Glauconycteris variegata LC
    - Genus: Laephotis
      - De Winton's long-eared bat, Laephotis wintoni LC
    - Genus: Mimetillus
      - Moloney's mimic bat, Mimetillus moloneyi LC
    - Genus: Neoromicia
      - Cape serotine, Neoromicia capensis LC
      - Tiny serotine, Neoromicia guineensis LC
      - Banana pipistrelle, Neoromicia nanus LC
      - Somali serotine, Neoromicia somalicus LC
      - White-winged serotine, Neoromicia tenuipinnis LC
      - Zulu serotine, Neoromicia zuluensis LC
    - Genus: Nycticeinops
      - Schlieffen's bat, Nycticeinops schlieffeni LC
    - Genus: Pipistrellus
      - Mount Gargues pipistrelle, Pipistrellus aero VU
      - Rüppell's pipistrelle, Pipistrellus rueppelli LC
      - Rusty pipistrelle, Pipistrellus rusticus LC
    - Genus: Plecotus
      - Ethiopian big-eared bat, Plecotus balensis VU
    - Genus: Scotoecus
      - Dark-winged lesser house bat, Scotoecus hirundo DD
    - Genus: Scotophilus
      - African yellow bat, Scotophilus dinganii LC
      - Greenish yellow bat, Scotophilus viridis LC
  - Subfamily: Miniopterinae
    - Genus: Miniopterus
      - Greater long-fingered bat, Miniopterus inflatus LC
      - Natal long-fingered bat, Miniopterus natalensis NT
      - Common bent-wing bat, Miniopterus schreibersii LC
- Family: Rhinopomatidae
  - Genus: Rhinopoma
    - Egyptian mouse-tailed bat, R. cystops LC
    - Lesser mouse-tailed bat, Rhinopoma hardwickei LC
    - Macinnes's mouse-tailed bat, Rhinopoma macinnesi VU
    - Greater mouse-tailed bat, Rhinopoma microphyllum LC
    - Small mouse-tailed bat, Rhinopoma muscatellum LR/lc
- Family: Molossidae
  - Genus: Chaerephon
    - Ansorge's free-tailed bat, Chaerephon ansorgei LC
    - Gland-tailed free-tailed bat, Chaerephon bemmeleni LC
    - Spotted free-tailed bat, Chaerephon bivittata LC
    - Chapin's free-tailed bat, Chaerephon chapini DD
    - Nigerian free-tailed bat, Chaerephon nigeriae LC
    - Little free-tailed bat, Chaerephon pumila LC
  - Genus: Mops
    - Angolan free-tailed bat, Mops condylurus LC
    - Midas free-tailed bat, Mops midas LC
    - Dwarf free-tailed bat, Mops nanulus LC
  - Genus: Mormopterus
    - Natal free-tailed bat, Mormopterus acetabulosus VU
  - Genus: Otomops
    - Large-eared free-tailed bat, Otomops martiensseni NT
  - Genus: Platymops
    - Peters's flat-headed bat, Platymops setiger DD
  - Genus: Tadarida
    - Egyptian free-tailed bat, Tadarida aegyptiaca LC
    - African giant free-tailed bat, Tadarida ventralis NT
- Family: Emballonuridae
  - Genus: Coleura
    - African sheath-tailed bat, Coleura afra LC
  - Genus: Taphozous
    - Mauritian tomb bat, Taphozous mauritianus LC
    - Egyptian tomb bat, Taphozous perforatus LC
- Family: Nycteridae
  - Genus: Nycteris
    - Andersen's slit-faced bat, Nycteris aurita DD
    - Hairy slit-faced bat, Nycteris hispida LC
    - Large-eared slit-faced bat, Nycteris macrotis LC
    - Parissi's slit-faced bat, Nycteris parisii DD
    - Egyptian slit-faced bat, Nycteris thebaica LC
- Family: Megadermatidae
  - Genus: Cardioderma
    - Heart-nosed bat, Cardioderma cor LC
  - Genus: Lavia
    - Yellow-winged bat, Lavia frons LC
- Family: Rhinolophidae
  - Subfamily: Rhinolophinae
    - Genus: Rhinolophus
      - Blasius's horseshoe bat, R. blasii LC
      - Geoffroy's horseshoe bat, Rhinolophus clivosus LC
      - Eloquent horseshoe bat, Rhinolophus eloquens DD
      - Rüppell's horseshoe bat, Rhinolophus fumigatus LC
      - Hildebrandt's horseshoe bat, Rhinolophus hildebrandti LC
      - Lesser horseshoe bat, Rhinolophus hipposideros LC
      - Lander's horseshoe bat, Rhinolophus landeri LC
      - Bushveld horseshoe bat, Rhinolophus simulator LC
  - Subfamily: Hipposiderinae
    - Genus: Asellia
      - Patrizi's trident leaf-nosed bat, Asellia patrizii VU
      - Trident leaf-nosed bat, Asellia tridens LC
    - Genus: Hipposideros
      - Sundevall's roundleaf bat, Hipposideros caffer LC
      - Commerson's roundleaf bat, Hipposideros marungensis NT
      - Ethiopian large-eared roundleaf bat, Hipposideros megalotis NT
      - Noack's roundleaf bat, Hipposideros ruber LC
    - Genus: Triaenops
      - Persian trident bat, Triaenops persicus LC

== Order: Pholidota (pangolins) ==
The order Pholidota comprises eight pangolin species, which feed on ants and have powerful claws, an elongated snout and a long tongue.

- Family: Manidae
  - Genus: Manis
    - Ground pangolin, Manis temminckii VU

== Order: Carnivora (carnivorans) ==
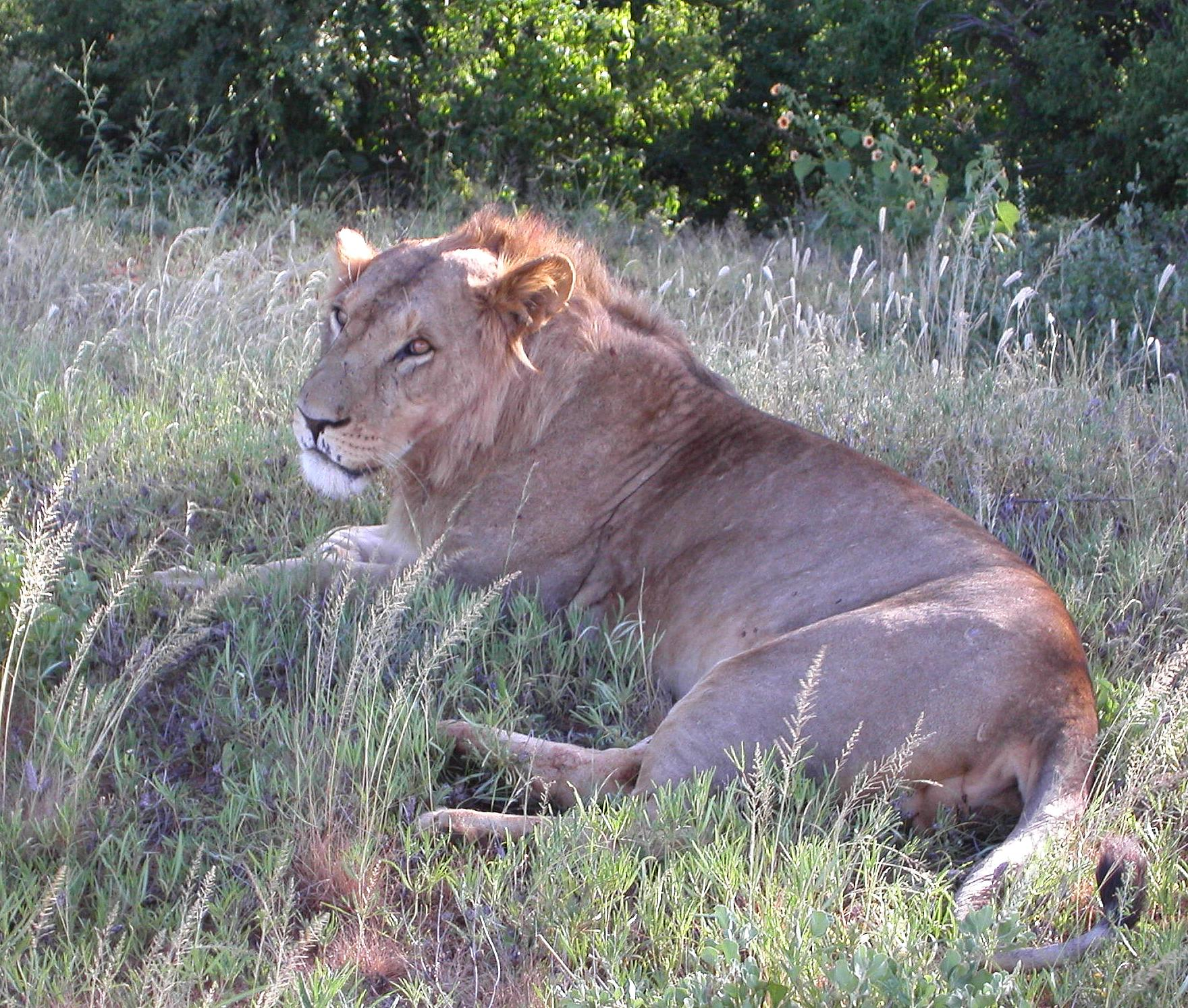
Lion

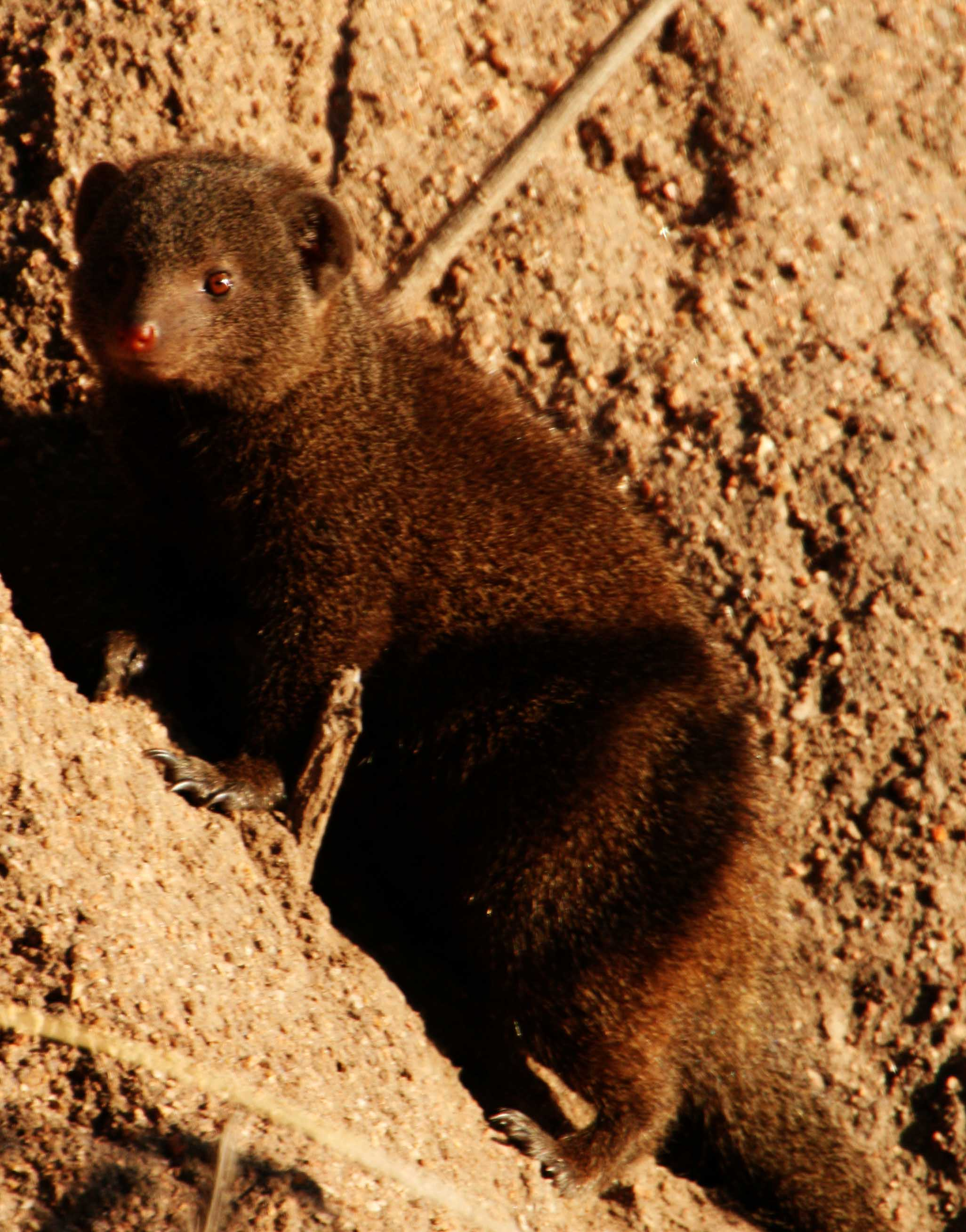
Common dwarf mongoose

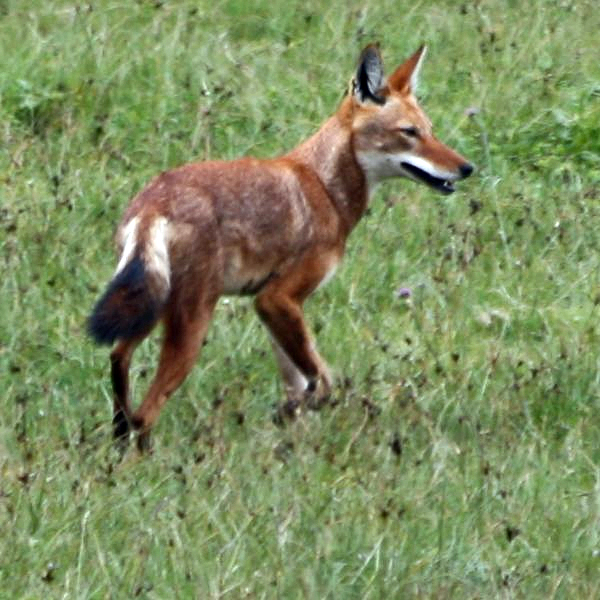
Ethiopian wolf

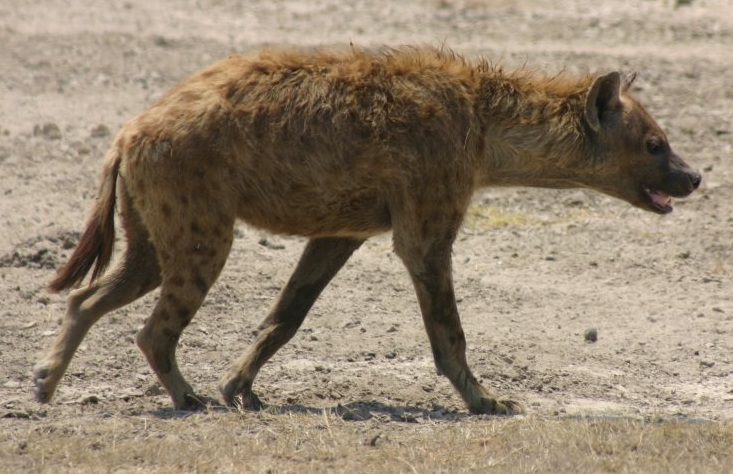
Spotted hyena

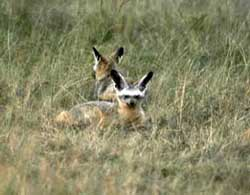
Bat-eared fox

There are over 260 species of carnivorans, the majority of which feed primarily on meat. They have a characteristic skull shape and dentition.

- Suborder: Feliformia
  - Family: Felidae (cats)
    - Subfamily: Felinae
      - Genus: Acinonyx
        - Cheetah, A. jubatus VU
          - Northeast African cheetah, A. j. soemmeringii EN
      - Genus: Caracal
        - Caracal, Caracal caracal LC
      - Genus: Felis
        - African wildcat, F. lybica LC
      - Genus: Leptailurus
        - Serval, Leptailurus serval LC
    - Subfamily: Pantherinae
      - Genus: Panthera
        - Lion, Panthera leo VU
          - Northern lion, Panthera leo leo EN
          - Southern lion, Panthera leo melanochaita EN
        - Leopard, Panthera pardus VU
          - African leopard, Panthera pardus pardus VU
  - Family: Viverridae
    - Subfamily: Viverrinae
      - Genus: Civettictis
        - African civet, Civettictis civetta LC
      - Genus: Genetta
        - Abyssinian genet, Genetta abyssinica DD
        - Common genet, Genetta genetta LC
        - Rusty-spotted genet, Genetta maculata LC
  - Family: Herpestidae (mongooses)
    - Genus: Atilax
      - Marsh mongoose, Atilax paludinosus LC
    - Genus: Helogale
      - Ethiopian dwarf mongoose, Helogale hirtula LC
      - Common dwarf mongoose, Helogale parvula LC
    - Genus: Herpestes
      - Egyptian mongoose, Herpestes ichneumon LC
      - Common slender mongoose, Herpestes sanguineus LC
      - Somalian slender mongoose, Herpestes ochracea LC
    - Genus: Mungos
      - Banded mongoose, Mungos mungo LC
    - Genus: Ichneumia
      - White-tailed mongoose, Ichneumia albicauda LC
  - Family: Hyaenidae (hyaenas)
    - Genus: Crocuta
      - Spotted hyena, Crocuta crocuta LC
    - Genus: Hyaena
      - Striped hyena, Hyaena hyaena NT
    - Genus: Proteles
      - Aardwolf, Proteles cristatus LC
- Suborder: Caniformia
  - Family: Canidae (dogs, foxes)
    - Genus: Vulpes
      - Pale fox, Vulpes pallida LC
      - Rüppell's fox, Vulpes rueppelli LC
    - Genus: Canis
      - African golden wolf, Canis lupaster LC
      - Ethiopian wolf, Canis simensis EN
    - Genus: Lupulella
      - Side-striped jackal, L. adusta LC
      - Black-backed jackal, L. mesomelas LC
    - Genus: Otocyon
      - Bat-eared fox, Otocyon megalotis LC
    - Genus: Lycaon
      - African wild dog, Lycaon pictus EN
  - Family: Mustelidae (mustelids)
    - Genus: Ictonyx
      - Striped polecat, Ictonyx striatus LC
    - Genus: Mellivora
      - Honey badger, M. capensis LC
        - Ethiopian honey badger, M. capensis abyssinica
    - Genus: Hydrictis
      - Spotted-necked otter, H. maculicollis LC
    - Genus: Aonyx
      - African clawless otter, A. capensis LC

== Order: Perissodactyla (odd-toed ungulates) ==
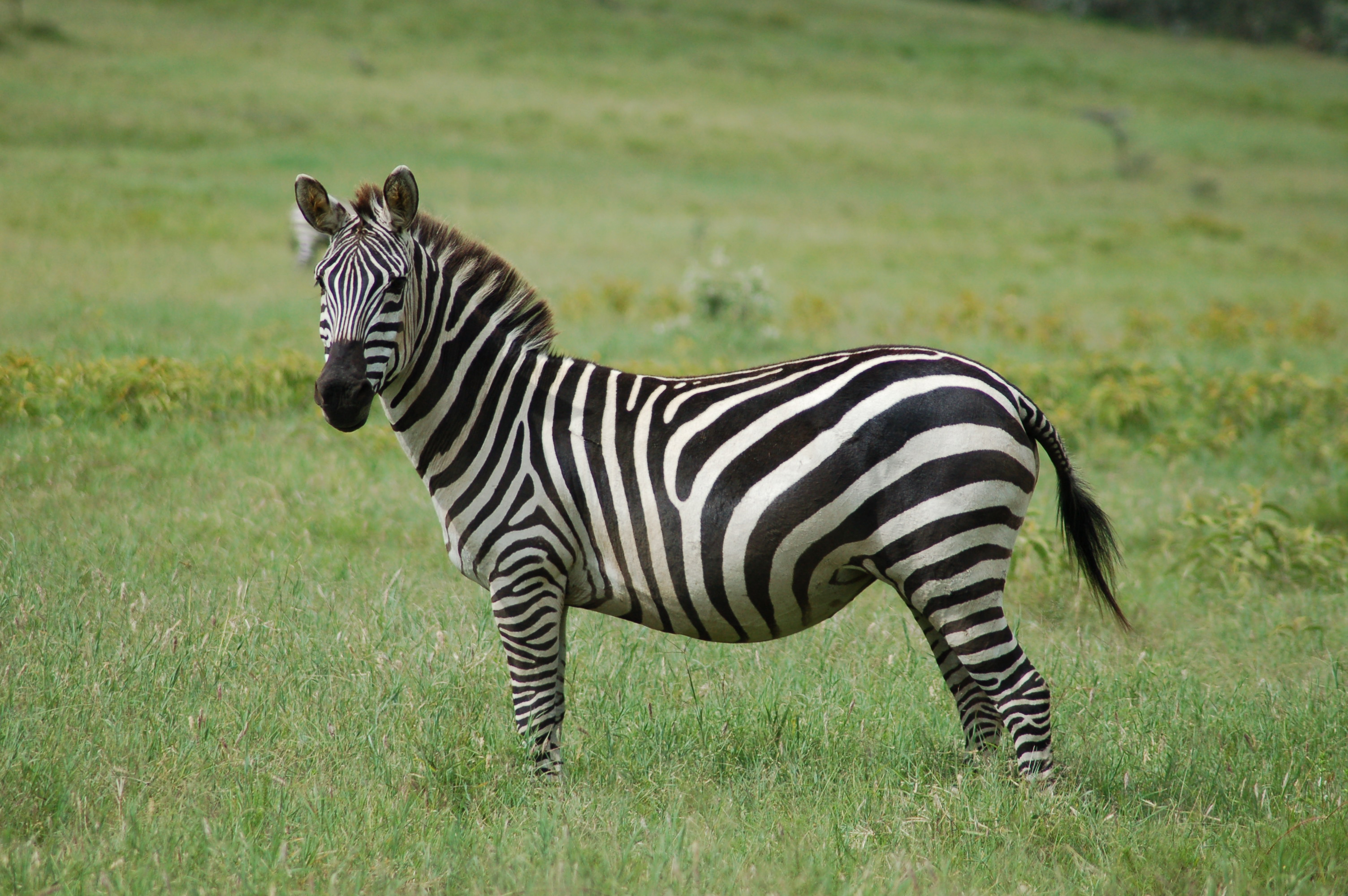
Grant's zebra

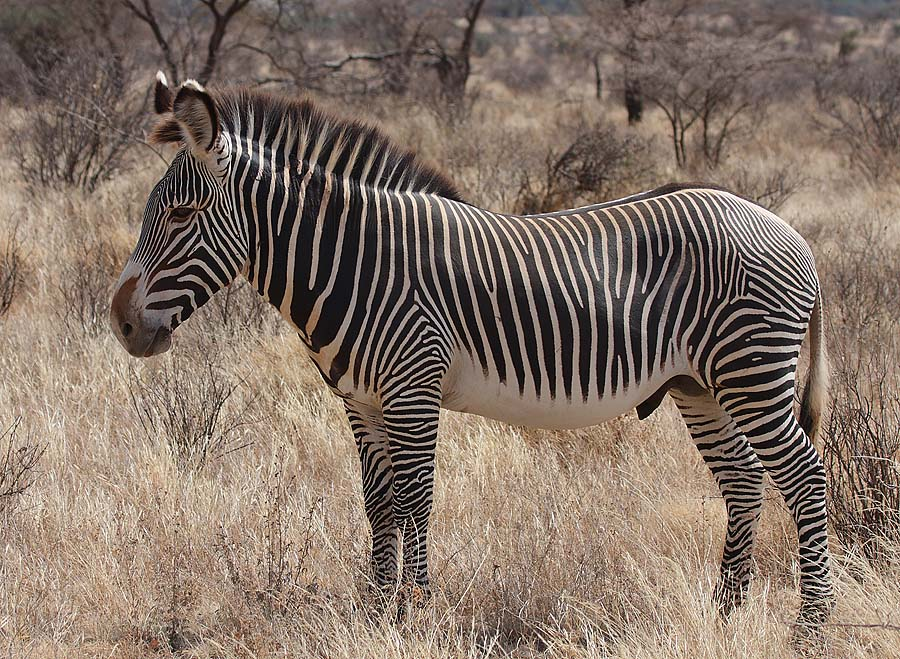
Grevy's zebra

The odd-toed ungulates are browsing and grazing mammals. They are usually large to very large and have relatively simple stomachs and a large middle toe.

- Family: Equidae (horses etc.)
  - Genus: Equus
    - African wild ass, E. africanus CR
      - Somali wild ass, E. a. somaliensis CR
    - Grevy's zebra, E. grevyi EN
    - Plains zebra, E. quagga NT
      - Grant's zebra, E. q. boehmi
- Family: Rhinocerotidae
  - Genus: Diceros
    - Black rhinoceros, D. bicornis CR
      - Eastern black rhinoceros, D. b. michaeli CR/locally extinct

== Order: Artiodactyla (even-toed ungulates) ==
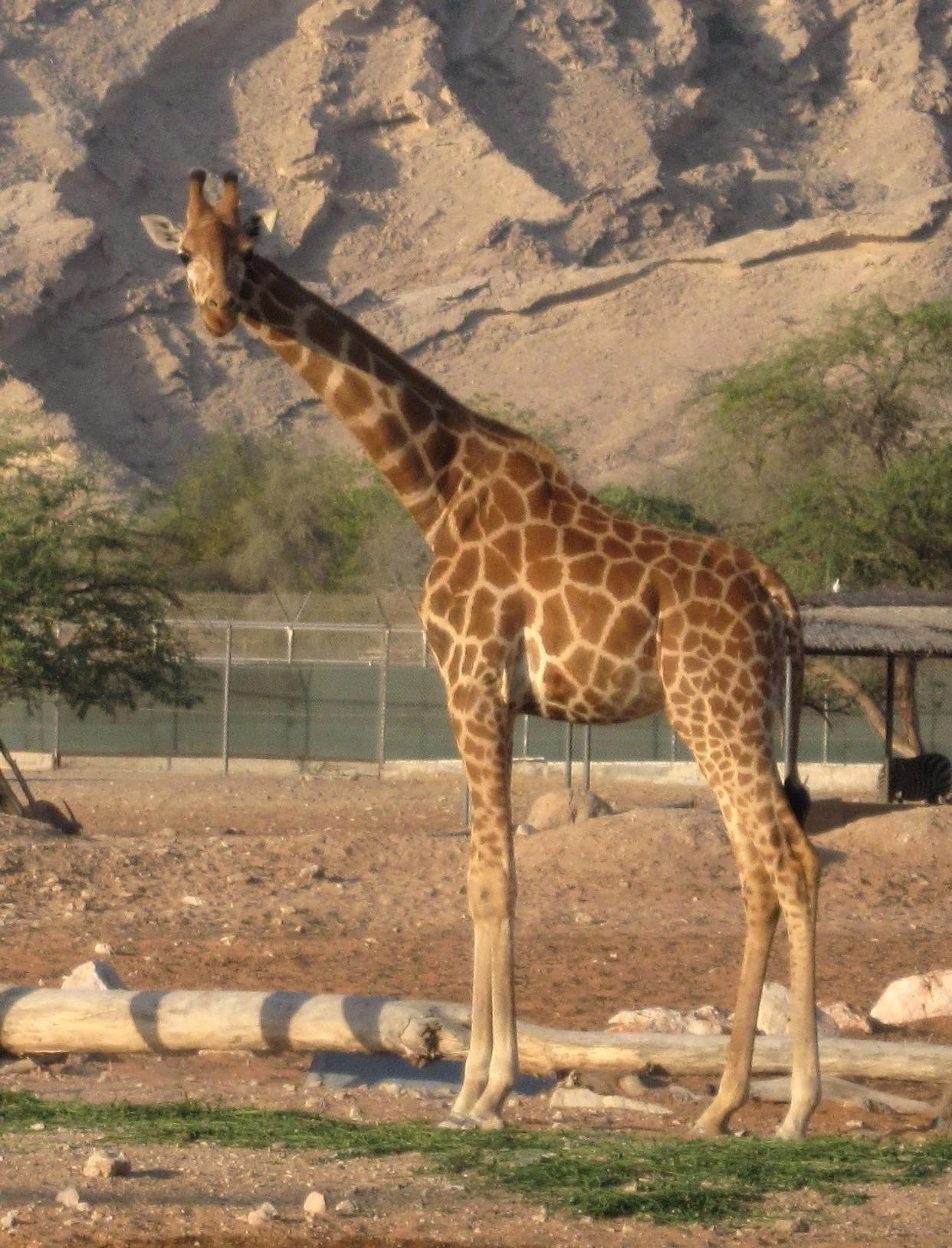
Nubian giraffe

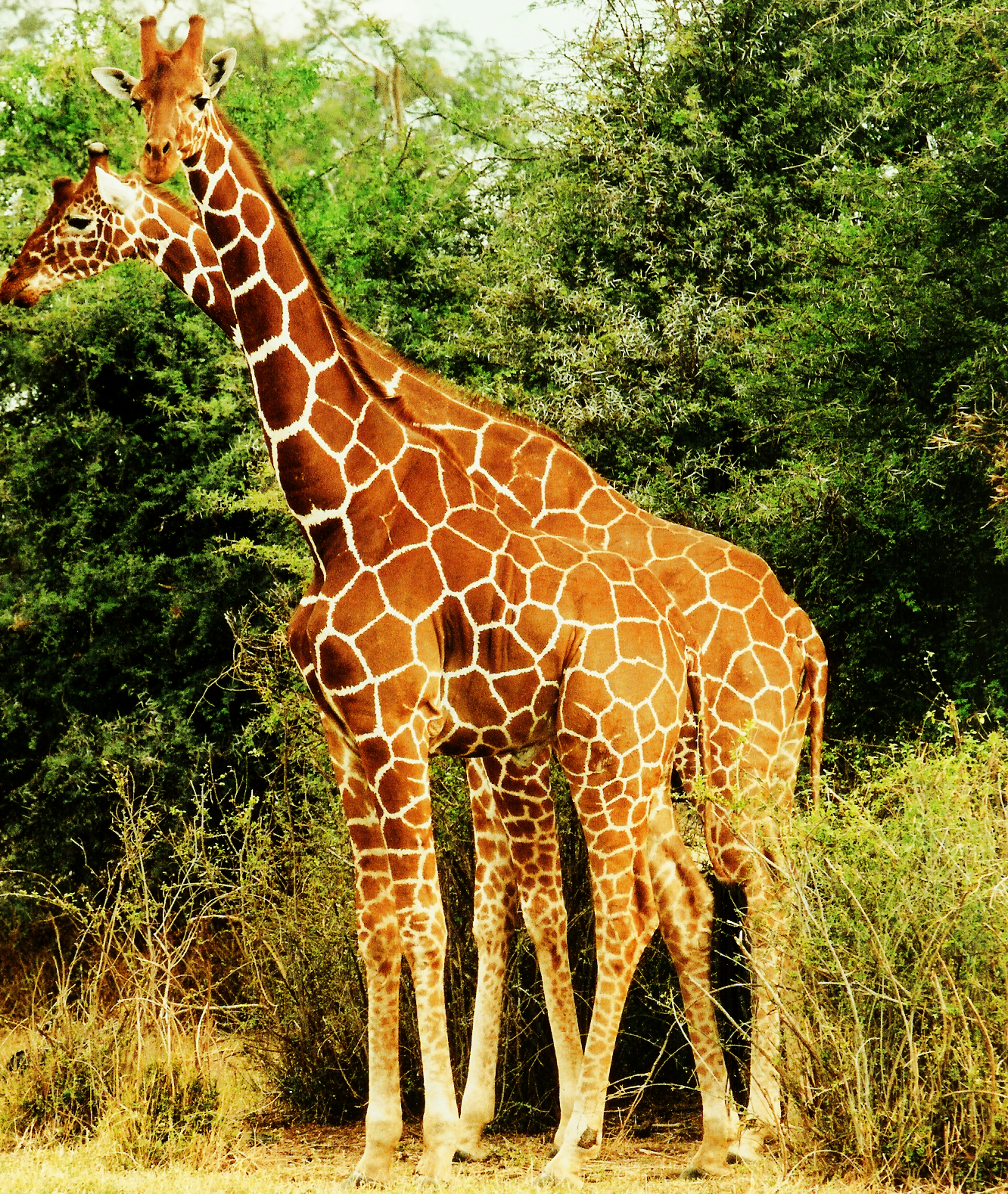
Reticulated giraffe

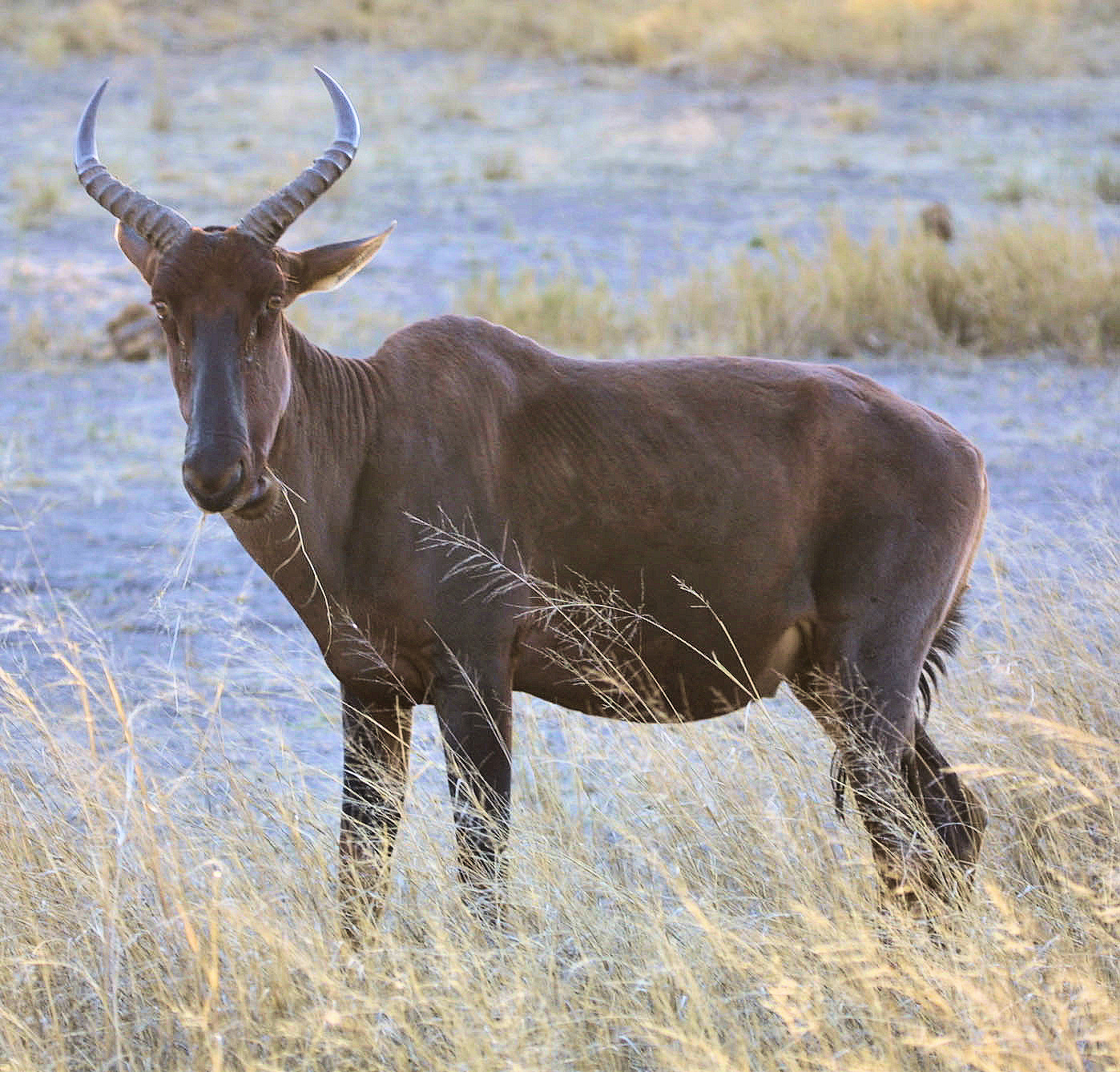
Topi

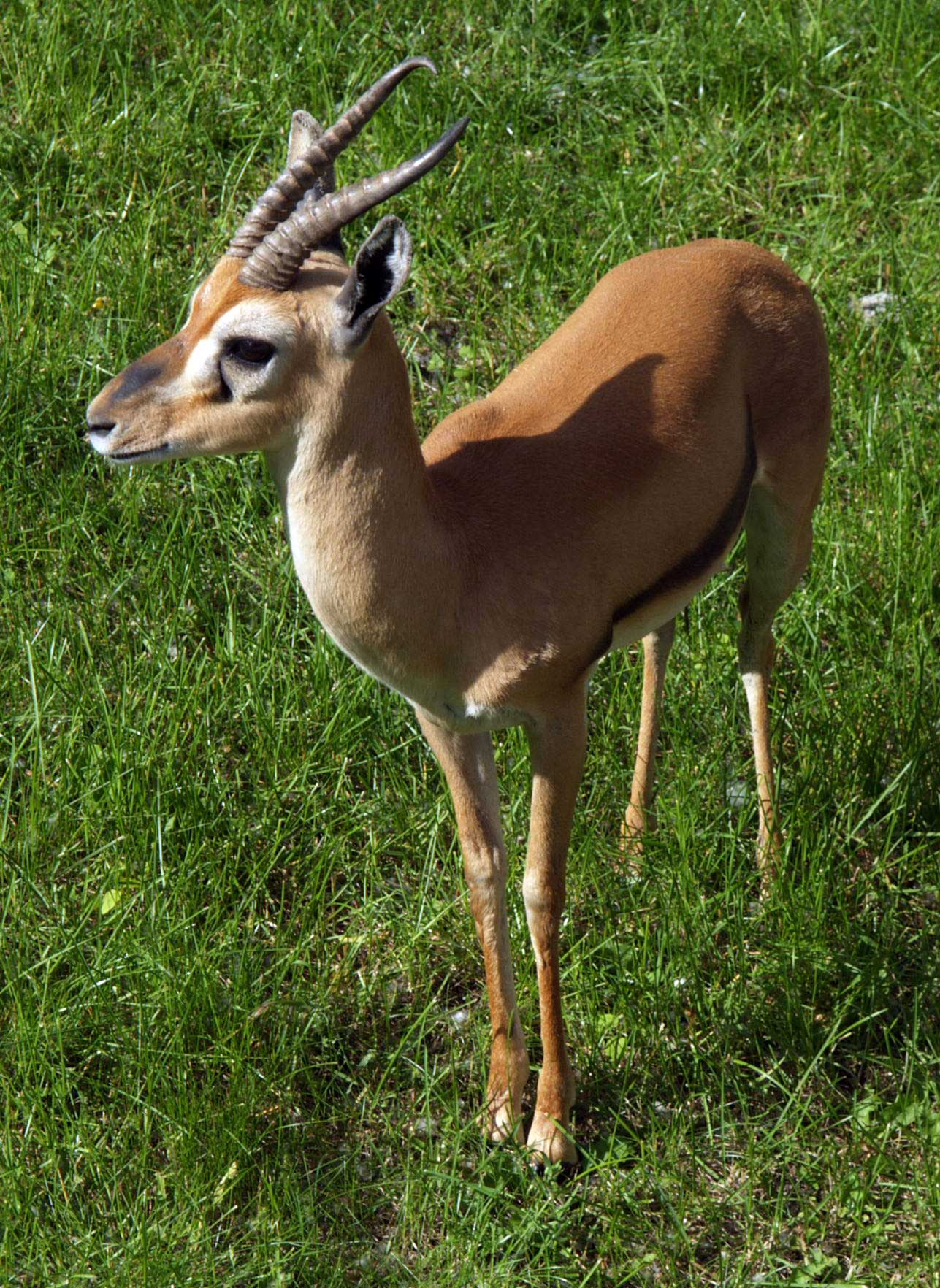
Red-fronted gazelle

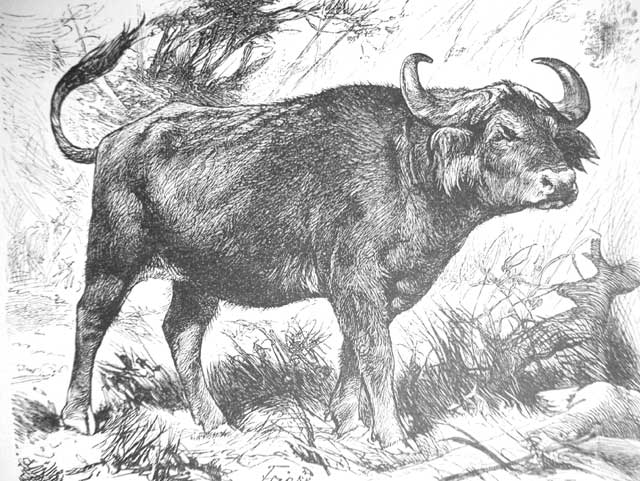
African buffalo

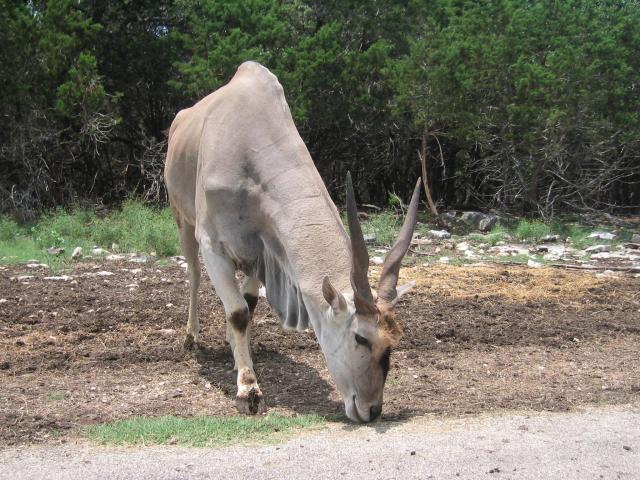
Common eland

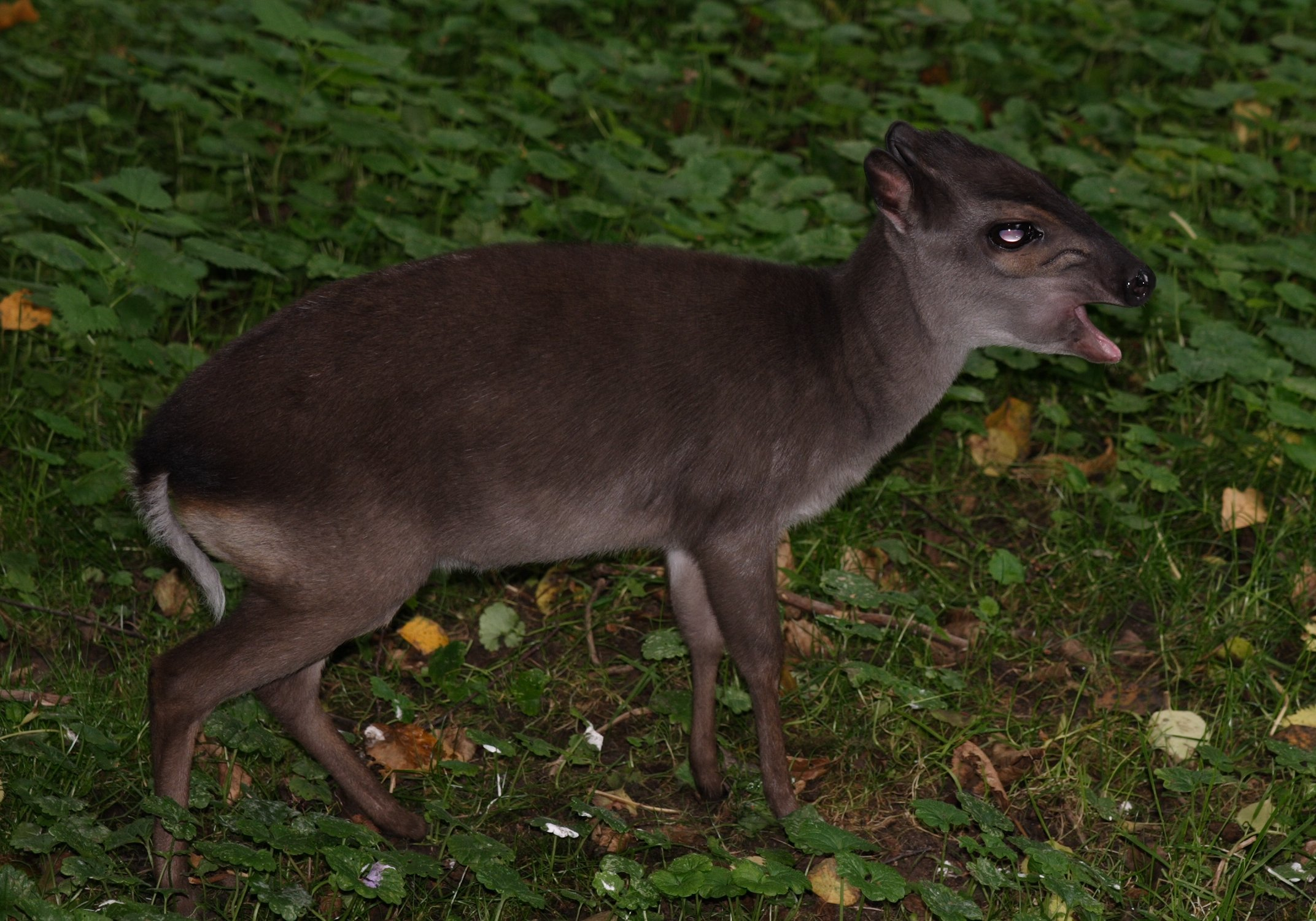
Blue duiker

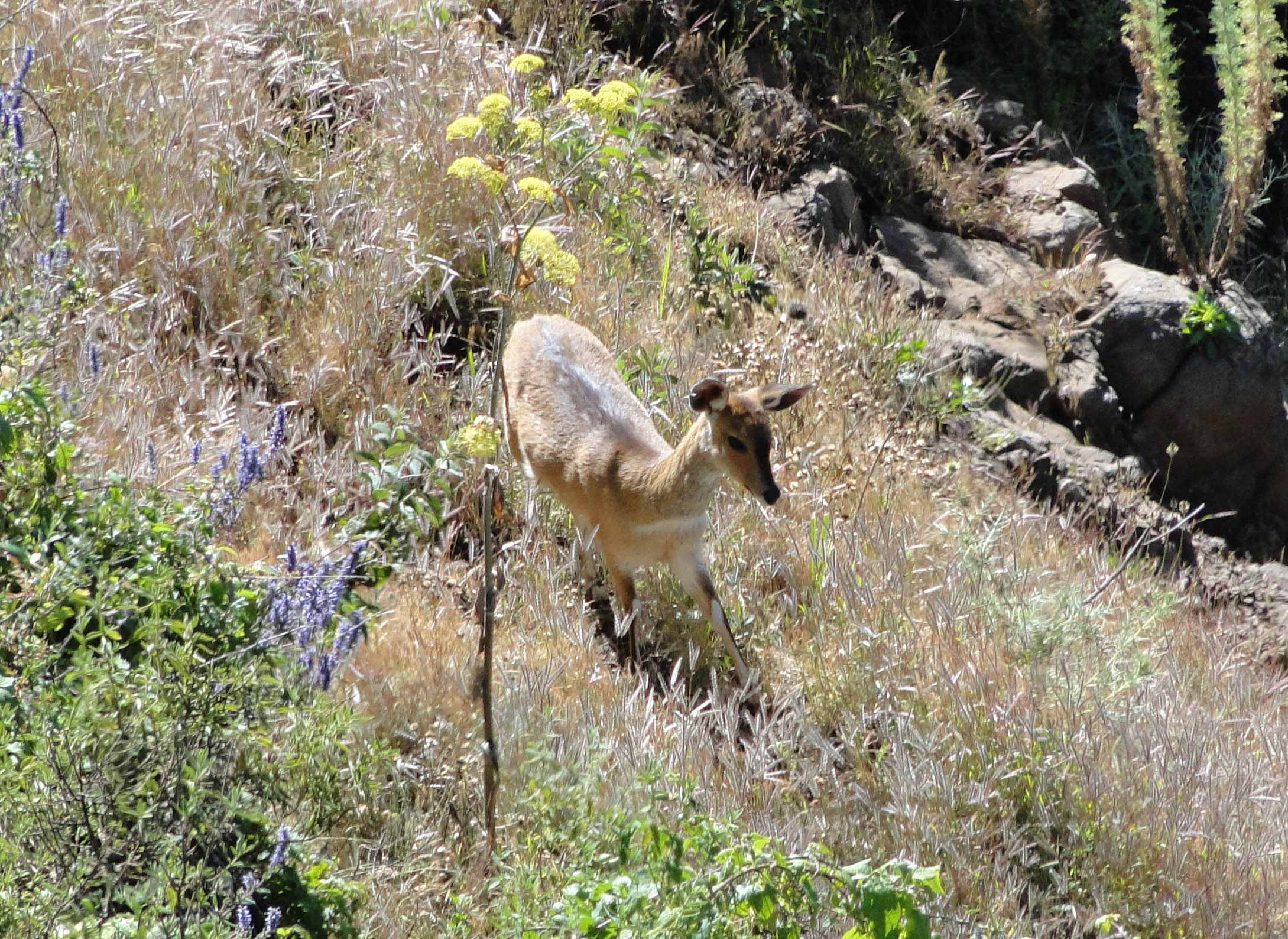
Mountain nyala

The even-toed ungulates are ungulates whose weight is borne about equally by the third and fourth toes, rather than mostly or entirely by the third as in perissodactyls. There are about 220 artiodactyl species, including many that are of great economic importance to humans.

- Family: Suidae (pigs)
  - Subfamily: Phacochoerinae
    - Genus: Phacochoerus
      - Desert warthog, Phacochoerus aethiopicus
      - Common warthog, Phacochoerus africanus
  - Subfamily: Suinae
    - Genus: Hylochoerus
      - Giant forest hog, Hylochoerus meinertzhageni
    - Genus: Potamochoerus
      - Bushpig, Potamochoerus larvatus
        - Potamochoerus larvatus hassama
- Family: Hippopotamidae (hippopotamuses)
  - Genus: Hippopotamus
    - Hippopotamus, Hippopotamus amphibius VU
- Family: Giraffidae (giraffe, okapi)
  - Genus: Giraffa
    - Giraffe, Giraffa camelopardalis VU
      - Nubian giraffe, Giraffa camelopardalis camelopardalis CR
      - Reticulated giraffe, Giraffa camelopardalis reticulata EN
- Family: Bovidae (cattle, antelope, sheep, goats)
  - Subfamily: Alcelaphinae
    - Genus: Alcelaphus
      - Hartebeest, Alcelaphus buselaphus
        - Lelwel hartebeest, Alcelaphus buselaphus lelwel EN
        - Swayne's hartebeest, Alcelaphus buselaphus swaynei EN
        - Tora hartebeest, Alcelaphus buselaphus tora CR
    - Genus: Damaliscus
      - Topi, Damaliscus lunatus VU
        - Tiang, Damaliscus lunatus tiang LC
  - Subfamily: Antilopinae
    - Genus: Ammodorcas
      - Dibatag, Ammodorcas clarkei VU
    - Genus: Dorcatragus
      - Beira, Dorcatragus megalotis VU
    - Genus: Gazella
      - Dorcas gazelle, Gazella dorcas VU
      - Grant's gazelle, Gazella granti
      - Red-fronted gazelle, Gazella rufifrons VU
      - Soemmerring's gazelle, Gazella soemmerringii VU
      - Speke's gazelle, Gazella spekei VU possibly extirpated
      - Thomson's gazelle, Gazella thomsonii
    - Genus: Litocranius
      - Gerenuk, Litocranius walleri
    - Genus: Madoqua
      - Günther's dik-dik, Madoqua guentheri
      - Salt's dik-dik, Madoqua saltiana
    - Genus: Oreotragus
      - Klipspringer, Oreotragus oreotragus
    - Genus: Ourebia
      - Oribi, Ourebia ourebi
  - Subfamily: Bovinae
    - Genus: Syncerus
      - African buffalo, Syncerus caffer
    - Genus: Tragelaphus
      - Mountain nyala, Tragelaphus buxtoni EN
      - Lesser kudu, Tragelaphus imberbis
      - Common eland, Tragelaphus oryx
      - Northern bushbuck, Tragelaphus scriptus
      - Southern bushbuck, Tragelaphus sylvaticus
        - Menelik's bushbuck, Tragelaphus sylvaticus meneliki EN
      - Greater kudu, Tragelaphus strepsiceros
  - Subfamily: Caprinae
    - Genus: Capra
      - Nubian ibex, Capra nubiana VU
      - Walia ibex, Capra walie VU
  - Subfamily: Cephalophinae
    - Genus: Cephalophus
      - Harvey's duiker, Cephalophus harveyi
      - Blue duiker, Cephalophus monticola
    - Genus: Sylvicapra
      - Common duiker, Sylvicapra grimmia
  - Subfamily: Hippotraginae
    - Genus: Hippotragus
      - Roan antelope, Hippotragus equinus
    - Genus: Oryx
      - East African oryx, Oryx beisa
  - Subfamily: Reduncinae
    - Genus: Kobus
      - Waterbuck, Kobus ellipsiprymnus
      - Kob, Kobus kob
      - Nile lechwe, Kobus megaceros
    - Genus: Redunca
      - Mountain reedbuck, Redunca fulvorufula LC
      - Bohor reedbuck, Redunca redunca

== See also ==
- List of chordate orders
- Lists of mammals by region
- List of prehistoric mammals
- Mammal classification
- List of mammals described in the 2000s
- Great Nile Migration Landscape
