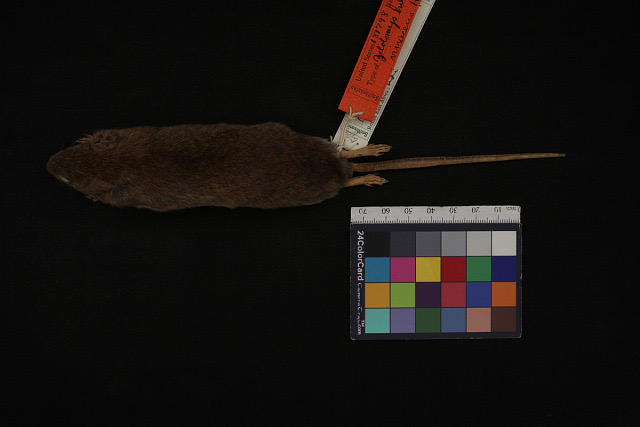
- Zelotomys hildegardeae specimen with tail measurement

Conservation status
- Least Concern (IUCN 3.1)

Scientific classification
- Kingdom: Animalia
- Phylum: Chordata
- Class: Mammalia
- Order: Rodentia
- Family: Muridae
- Genus: Zelotomys
- Species: Z. hildegardeae

Binomial name
- Zelotomys hildegardeae (Thomas, 1902)
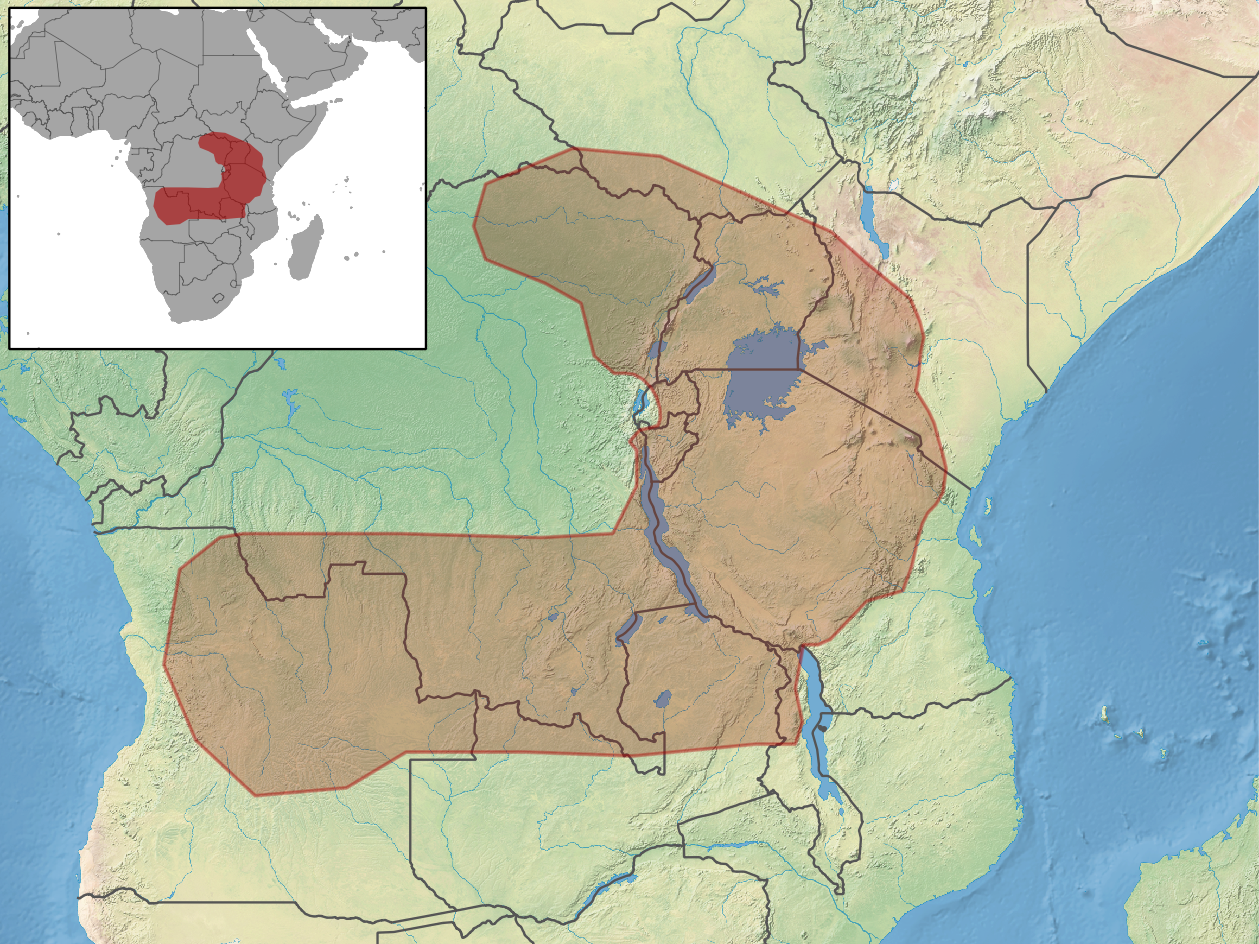

Synonyms
- Zelotomys instans Thomas, 1916; Zelotomys kuvelaiensis St. Leger, 1936; Zelotomys lillyana Bohmann, 1950; Zelotomys shortridgei Hinton, 1920; Zelotomys vinaceus Heller, 1912

= Hildegarde's broad-headed mouse =

Species of rodent

Hildegarde's broad-headed mouse (Zelotomys hildegardeae) or Hildegarde's zelotomys is a species of rodent in the family Muridae. It is found in Central Africa.

== Taxonomy ==
This mouse was first described in 1902 by the British zoologist Oldfield Thomas. The specific name "hildegardeae" was given in honour of the British anthropologist Hildegarde Beatrice Hinde, who spent twenty-four years in Africa with her husband Sidney Langford Hinde, a colonial administrator; she studied East African languages, writing several grammars and vocabularies.

== Description ==
Hildegarde's broad-headed mouse grows to a head-and-body length of about 125 mm (5 in). The head is broad with pale grey to white cheeks and whitish chin and throat. The whiskers are dark and the ears are dark and nearly naked, with a scattering of pale hairs. The fur is dense and soft; the dorsal surface of the head and body is greyish-brown or grey and the underparts are whitish or pale greyish-brown, the two colours merging on the flanks. The limbs are whitish, the feet sometimes having pale brown upper surfaces. The tail is about 70% of the head-and-body length; it bears rings of small scales and is scantily haired, with short white or greyish-brown hairs. This mouse produces a strong, unpleasant odour which may deter predators.

== Distribution and habitat ==
This mouse is endemic to tropical Central Africa. Its range extends from Angola, northern Zambia and southern Democratic Republic of the Congo, eastwards to Tanzania, and northwards to Uganda, Kenya and South Sudan. Individuals recorded in southern Angola were probably the closely related Woosnam's broad-headed mouse (Zelotomys woosnami). Its typical habitat is moist savanna, tall grassland and scrub, often at the edge of swamps or forests. It is often found in areas of Imperata cylindrica grassland. In northern Malawi it has been recorded in pine plantations and in close proximity to human habitations. Its altitudinal range is unknown.

== Ecology ==
This mouse is a partially diurnal and nocturnal species, and in captivity, is active throughout the night. It forages on the ground under cover of the long grasses and foliage and feeds mainly on arthropods, such as grasshoppers and crickets, dung beetles, other insects and myriapods, with some fruit. It communicates with other individuals by making high-pitched whistles. Despite its strong smell, it is preyed on by small carnivores. In Kenya, pregnant females have been found in June and November, while in Uganda, they have been found in February, March, May, June and July. The litter size is usually between three and seven.

== Status ==
Hildegarde's broad-headed mouse has a very wide range but is nowhere particularly common. No specific threats have been identified and the mouse is present in a number of protected areas, so the International Union for Conservation of Nature has assessed its conservation status as being of "least concern".
