= Hildegarde Beatrice Hinde =

British anthropologist (1871–1959)

Hildegarde Beatrice Hinde (née Ginsburg) (1871 – 20 February 1959) was an English anthropologist, linguist, writer and an amateur naturalist. She wrote two books about East African languages and collaborated with her husband, Sidney Langford Hinde, on a book about the Maasai people. She is commemorated in the names of three African mammals.

== Family ==
She was a daughter of the biblical scholar Christian David Ginsburg and his second wife, Emilie Hausburg. Her older sister Emilie Catherine married the geographer Halford Mackinder in 1889. In 1897, Hildegarde married Sidney Langford Hinde, a colonial administrator in British East Africa. He was resident to the Maasai chief and collector of Maasailand.

== Writing ==
Hildegarde and Sidney Hinde were joint authors of The Last of the Masai, a book published by William Heinemann in 1901. It contains field notes describing some East African animals and birds and photographs including one showing a "lion shot by Mrs. S.L. Hinde".

In 1901, Cambridge University Press published Hildegarde Hinde's book The Masai language: grammatical notes together with a vocabulary. In a preface, she acknowledged that she had "no special philological qualifications", but that she had learned the language "directly from the Masai". A review in the anthropological journal Man by Robert Needham Cust described it as "an addition to our knowledge of an African language brought up to date, and to be depended upon, as derived from original sources".

Cambridge University Press published her Vocabularies of the Kamba and Kikuyu languages of East Africa in 1904. A review in Man remarked that this "admirable" book "should be in the hands of all travelling or settling in the regions where these dialects are spoken".

In 1907, The Empire Review published an article entitled "Empire in the making", in which she described the difficulty for colonial administrators in East Africa of dealing with "peoples recognising no supreme chief, peoples who maintain a condition of individual equality, where everyone is as good as his neighbour, and where, as a result, anarchy reigns". Her article "Magic among certain East African Tribes" was published in the Empire Review in 1906.

In 1926, Williams and Norgate published Some Problems of East Africa, in which she set out "to put forward what seems to be a possible solution to the grievous political difficulties that have arisen in recent years".

== Naturalist and collector ==
She was an amateur naturalist who contributed collections of bats and rodents to the British Museum. Three species of small African mammal were named in her honour by Oldfield Thomas; these were Hildegarde's tomb bat (Taphozous hildegardeae), Hildegarde's broad-headed mouse (Zelotomys hildegardeae) and Hildegarde's shrew (Crocidura hildegardeae).

== Later life ==
From 1914 to 1940, she lived with her widowed mother and her sister Emilie Mackinder on Capri. They moved to Switzerland in 1940. She died there on 2 February 1959.
