= Hinde's lesser house bat =

Scientific classification
- Kingdom: Animalia
- Phylum: Chordata
- Class: Mammalia
- Order: Chiroptera
- Family: Vespertilionidae
- Genus: Scotoecus
- Species: S. hindei

Binomial name
- Scotoecus hindei Thomas, 1901

Species of bat

Scotoecus hindei hindei

Hinde's lesser house bat (Scotoecus hindei) is a species of vesper bat. It is found in Cameroon, Republic of the Congo, Kenya, Malawi, Mozambique, Nigeria, Somalia, South Sudan, Tanzania, and Zambia. Its natural habitat is dry savanna. Oldfield Thomas named it in honor of Sidney Langford Hinde, a British officer and recreational naturalist.
