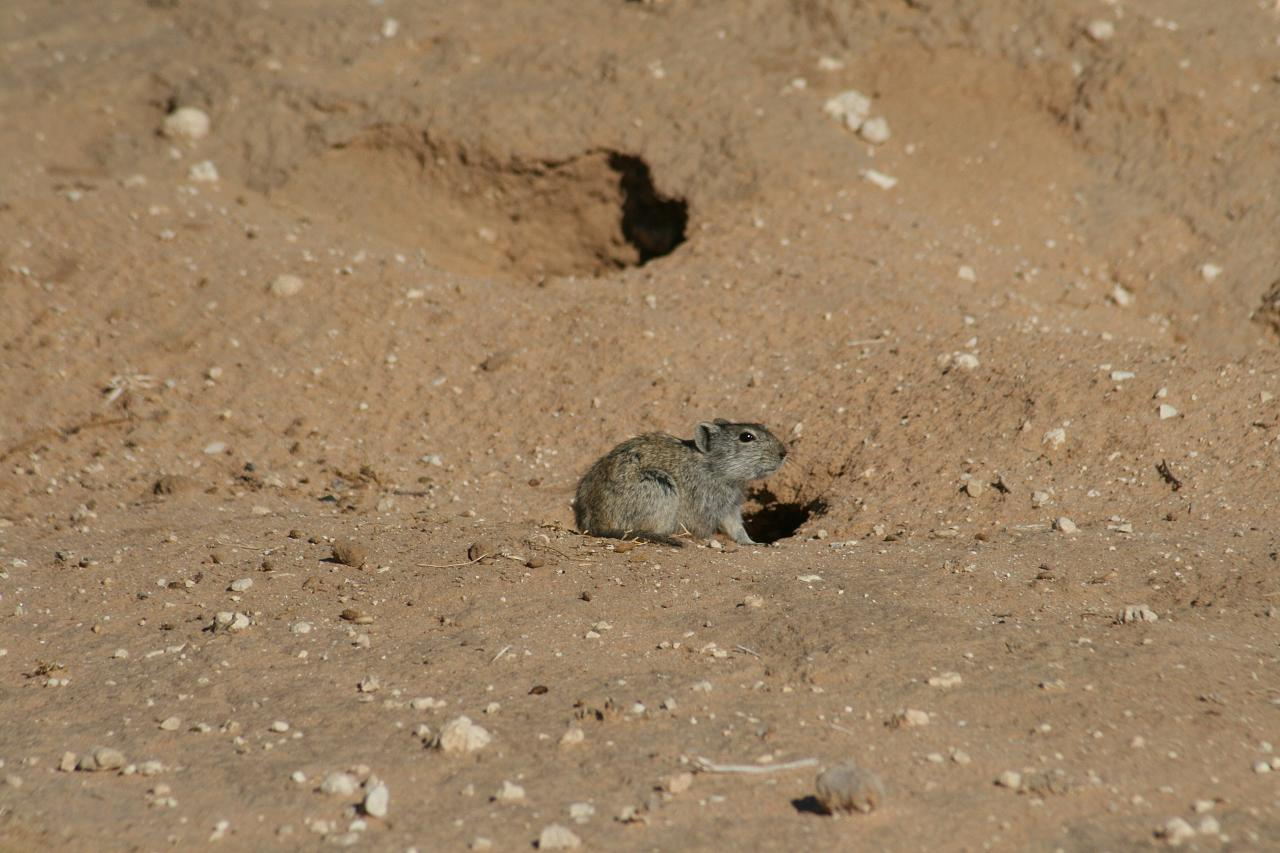
- Woosnam's broad-headed mouse

Scientific classification
- Kingdom: Animalia
- Phylum: Chordata
- Class: Mammalia
- Order: Rodentia
- Family: Muridae
- Tribe: Praomyini
- Genus: Zelotomys; Osgood, 1910

Type species
- Mus hildegardeae

Species
- See text

= Zelotomys =

Zelotomys Temporal range: Late Pliocene to Recent

Genus of rodents

Zelotomys is a genus of rodents in the subfamily Murinae, the Old World rats and mice. They are known commonly as the broad-headed mice. They are native to Africa. There are two species.

== Species ==
- Zelotomys hildegardeae – Hildegarde's broad-headed mouse
- Zelotomys woosnami – Woosnam's broad-headed mouse
