= Rupp's mouse =

Conservation status
- Data Deficient (IUCN 3.1)

Scientific classification
- Kingdom: Animalia
- Phylum: Chordata
- Class: Mammalia
- Order: Rodentia
- Family: Muridae
- Genus: Stenocephalemys
- Species: S. ruppi

Binomial name
- Stenocephalemys ruppi (Van der Straeten & Dieterlen, 1983)

Synonyms
- Myomys ruppi (Van der Straeten & Dieterlen, 1983)

Species of rodent

Rupp's mouse or Rupp's stenocephalemys (Stenocephalemys ruppi) is a species of rodent in the family Muridae. It is found only in Ethiopia. Its natural habitat is subtropical or tropical high-altitude shrubland. It is threatened by habitat loss.
