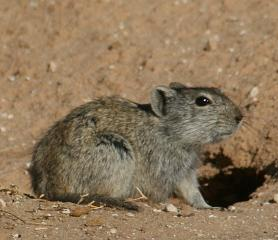

Conservation status
- Least Concern (IUCN 3.1)

Scientific classification
- Kingdom: Animalia
- Phylum: Chordata
- Class: Mammalia
- Order: Rodentia
- Family: Muridae
- Genus: Zelotomys
- Species: Z. woosnami

Binomial name
- Zelotomys woosnami (Schwann, 1906)
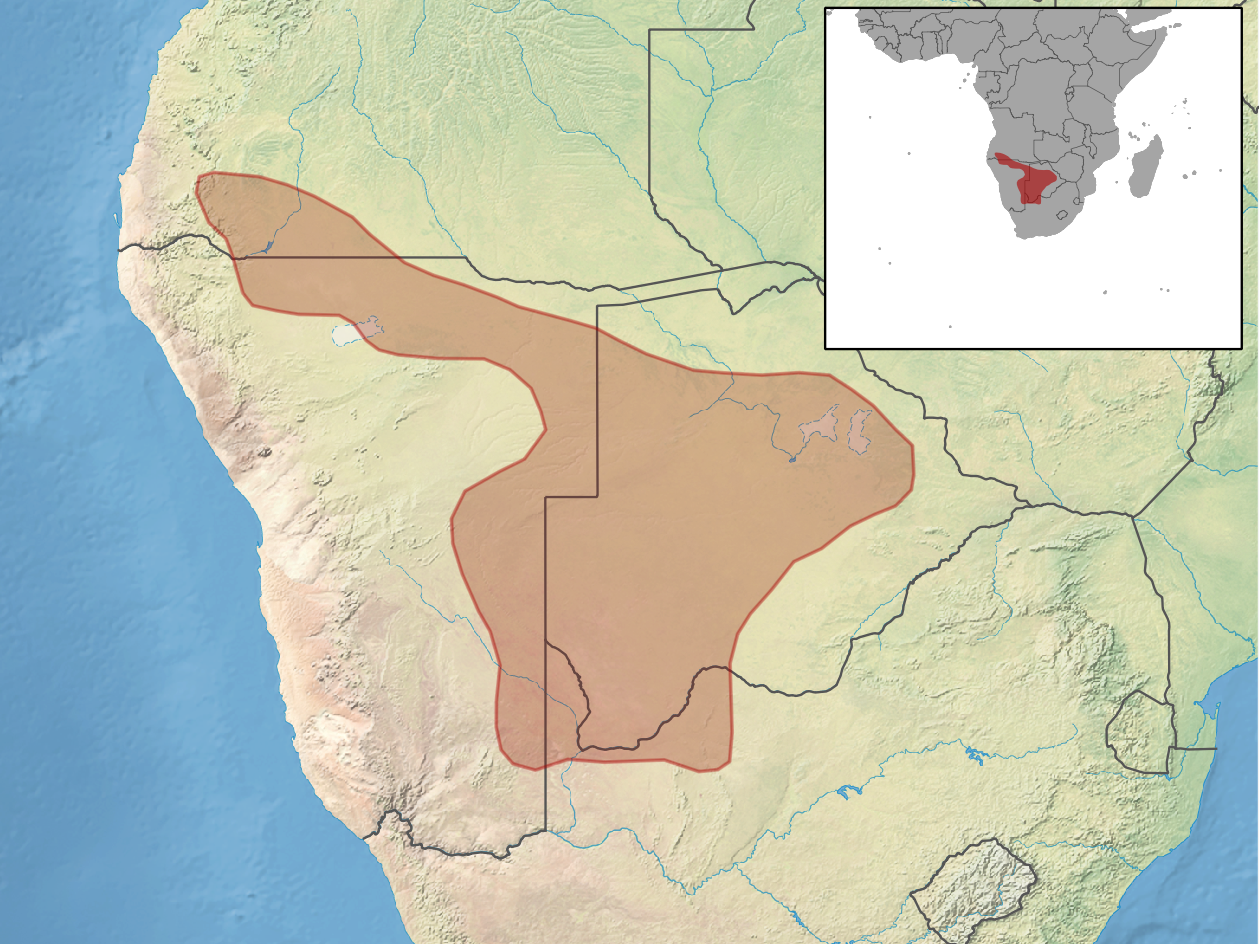

= Woosnam's broad-headed mouse =

Species of rodent

Woosnam's broad-headed mouse or Woosnam's zelotomys (Zelotomys woosnami) is a species of rodent in the family Muridae. It is found in Angola, Botswana, Namibia, and South Africa. Its natural habitat is dry savanna. Its tail is a little shorter than the combined length of its head and body. Fur is streaked tan, black, and light grey. The top of its feet and tail are white and it has off-white underparts. Weight is 55 g, total length is 24 cm, and tail length is 11 cm. It is nocturnal and it nests in burrows. Diet consists of insects and seeds. Its litters are born in summer; up to 11 pups are in a litter.
