= Gray-tailed narrow-headed rat =

Conservation status
- Least Concern (IUCN 3.1)

Scientific classification
- Kingdom: Animalia
- Phylum: Chordata
- Class: Mammalia
- Order: Rodentia
- Family: Muridae
- Genus: Stenocephalemys
- Species: S. griseicauda

Binomial name
- Stenocephalemys griseicauda Petter, 1972

Species of rodent

The gray-tailed narrow-headed rat (Stenocephalemys griseicauda) is a species of rodent in the family Muridae. It is found only in Ethiopia. Its natural habitats are subtropical or tropical moist montane forests, subtropical or tropical high-elevation shrubland, and subtropical or tropical high-elevation grassland. It is threatened by habitat loss.
