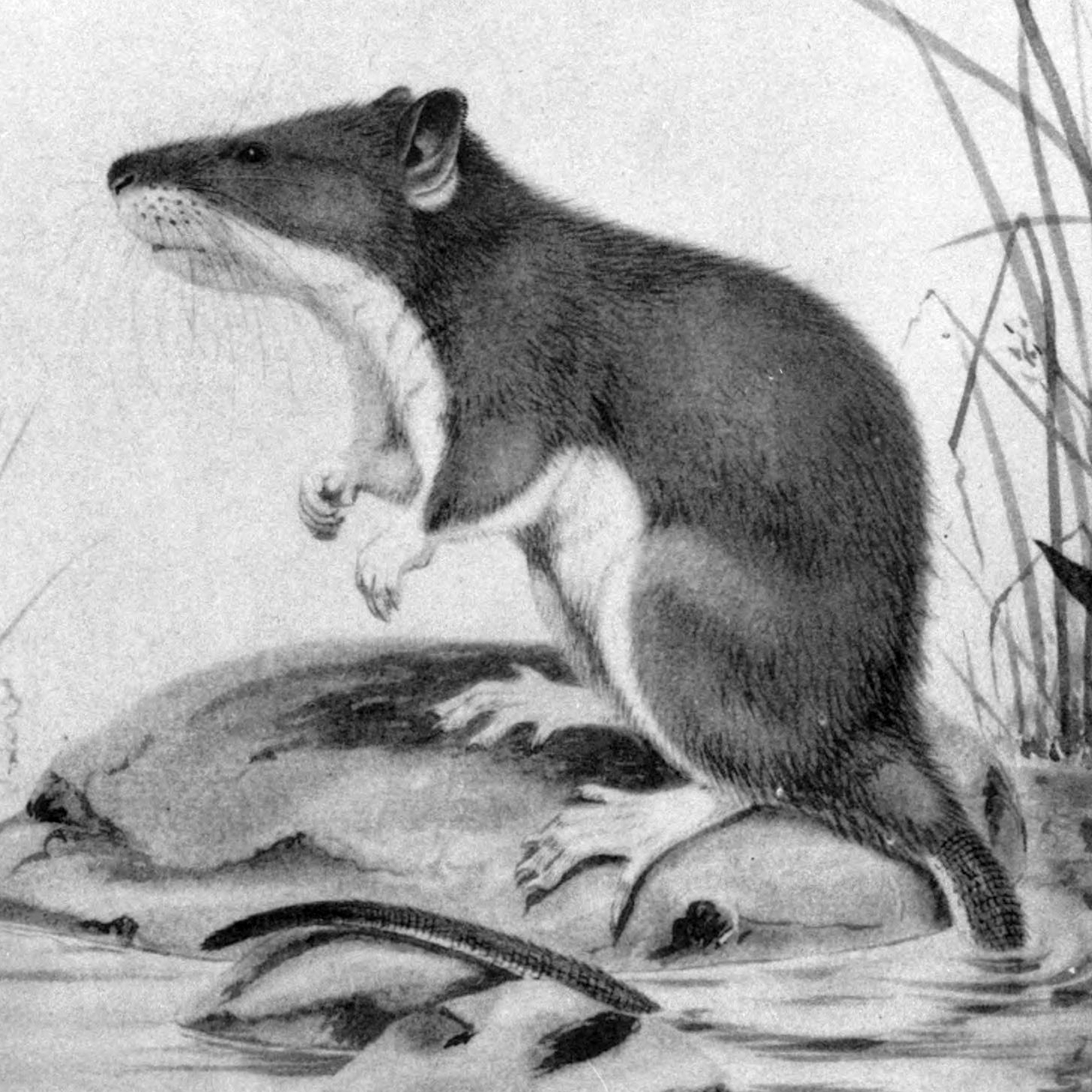

Conservation status
- Critically Endangered (IUCN 3.1)

Scientific classification
- Kingdom: Animalia
- Phylum: Chordata
- Class: Mammalia
- Order: Rodentia
- Family: Muridae
- Tribe: Praomyini
- Genus: Nilopegamys; Osgood, 1928
- Species: N. plumbeus

Binomial name
- Nilopegamys plumbeus Osgood, 1928
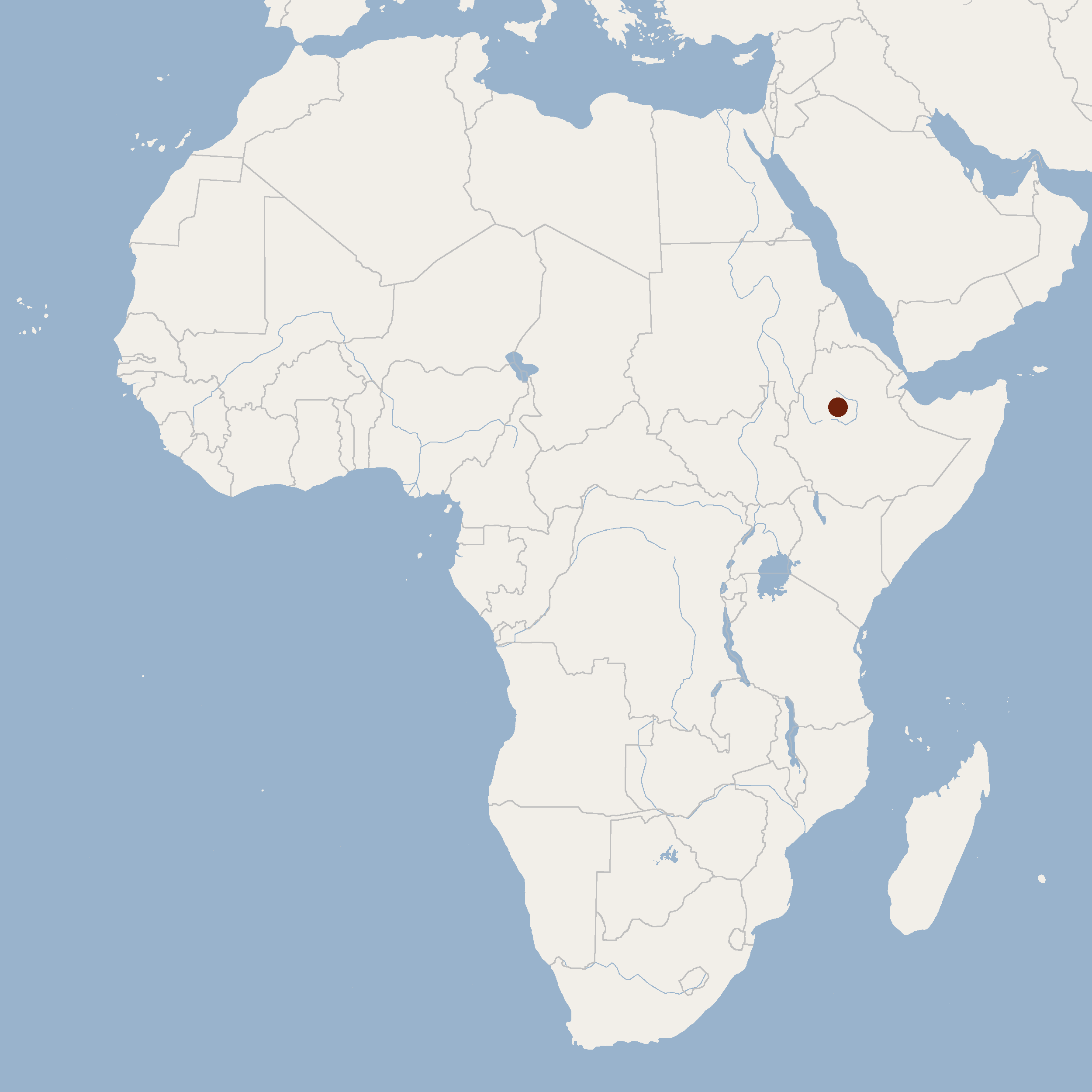
- Range according to Happold, 2013

= Ethiopian amphibious rat =

Species of rodent

The Ethiopian amphibious rat, also known as the Ethiopian water mouse (Nilopegamys plumbeus), is an insectivorous and semiaquatic species of rodent in the monotypic genus Nilopegamys of the family Muridae. There has only been one known specimen. It was found along the Lesser Abay River near its source at an altitude of 2600 m in the highlands of northwestern Ethiopia in 1928. The next discovery of this species by scientists was only in 2026.

N. plumbeus is considered to be the most aquatically adapted African murid; its unusually large brain is thought to be one consequence of this lifestyle. The species is considered to be critically endangered and until its rediscovery was feared to be extinct, since its habitat has been severely damaged by overgrazing and monoculture.

== Distribution and ecology ==
In late March 1928, the Ethiopian amphibious rat was cataloged for the first time. The specimen was discovered in a trap set by Wilfred H. Osgood, and was unlike any African rat he had seen before. The rat showed multiple adaptations to aquatic life which is uncommon for rats in Africa. Aquatic rats have been observed in South America but never before in east Africa.

The Ethiopian amphibious rat has been spotted very few times in the wild. It has been sighted in the Ethiopian highlands in their wetland areas. The single recovered specimen was from near Sekela and Njabarra in what was then the region of Gojjam, at an altitude of about 2,600 m AMSL and close to the upper Lesser Abay River in the northwest of central Ethiopia. This rat is listed as critically endangered but many researchers studying the rodent fear it is already extinct due to two failed attempts to locate and track the rat.

However, the species seems to be merely uncommon and hard to find, rather than entirely extinct or almost so. And while it is apparently intolerant of heavy grazing by cattle, it may well be more resilient to other human land uses: The three presumed N. plumbeus were from the Yayu biosphere reserve in Illubabor Zone, in the White Nile basin of western Ethiopia, hundreds of km southwest of the type locality. This region was traditionally dominated by widespread maize farming, and has recently seen a shift to coffee production after the late-1990s arrival of corn grey leaf spot disease. While the identification was only done from photographs, it is likely that these animals were N. plumbeus, since the only similar species in the region, the closely related African wading rat Colomys goslingi) (in which N. plumbeus was even sometimes included), does not seem to range into Ethiopia.

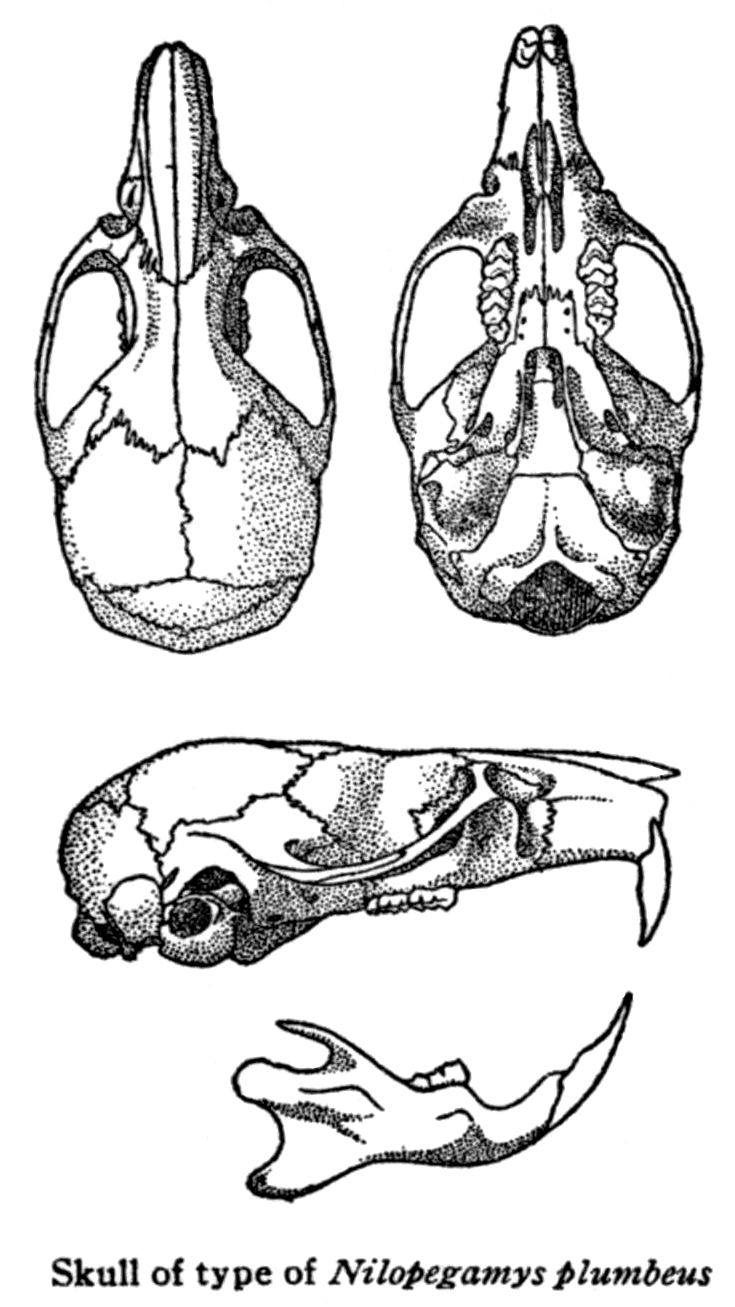

== Anatomy ==
This rat belongs to the family Muridae and has the largest cranial capacity of any African muroid ever sampled. They also have very large brains compared to their body size and given the average brain size of aquatic rodents.

Nilopegamys plumbeus is specifically adapted to live near or in close contact with water. There are other rodents adapted to live in wetlands such as marsh rice rat or the European water vole. Out of all other African aquatic rodents however, the Ethiopian amphibious rat has the most extreme adaptations to its environment. They have a pair of adapted "waders" on their feet recognizable as webbing. Since N. plumbeus is so specifically adapted to its environment it makes living elsewhere very difficult. This is why scientists think that with the degradation of its habitat, N. plumbeus disappeared from its type locality.

== Status ==
=== Threats ===
The main reason for the population decline of the Ethiopian amphibious rat is habitat loss. Although not much research has been done on the preexisting population size of this rat species, it can be said the population has declined drastically with the destruction of its habitat. The leading cause for the destruction of Ethiopian highland, wetlands is loss to livestock grazing. Their habitat at the type locality is almost completely destroyed due to this clearing for grazing, and there is little being done to protect it. Ranching has also contributed to this habitat loss but not to the same scale.

=== Conservation & further knowledge ===
At the time there is not much in place in terms of conservation for the Ethiopian amphibious rat. They are considered critically endangered by the IUCN red list and even possibly extinct. There is also very little research that has been done on this species. Currently, East African highland small mammals are being studied by Julian Kerbis Peterhans at the Field Museum in Chicago Illinois, USA. Almost all that is known about this species is taken from a single study that was conducted in the 1920s. More research about this species, its habits, and its environment are needed.
