= Ethiopian white-footed mouse =

Conservation status
- Least Concern (IUCN 3.1)

Scientific classification
- Kingdom: Animalia
- Phylum: Chordata
- Class: Mammalia
- Order: Rodentia
- Family: Muridae
- Genus: Stenocephalemys
- Species: S. albipes

Binomial name
- Stenocephalemys albipes (Rüppell, 1842)

Synonyms
- Myomys albipes (Rüppell, 1842)

Species of rodent

The Ethiopian white-footed mouse or white-footed stenocephalemys (Stenocephalemys albipes) is a species of rodent in the family Muridae. It lives in Ethiopia and Eritrea. Its natural habitats are tropical moist montane forest and tropical high-altitude shrubland.

== Description ==
This is a medium-sized species weighing about 60 g (2 oz), with an average head-and-body length of 132 mm (5.2 in) and a tail of 162 mm (6.4 in). The ears are large, rounded and scantily haired. The dorsal fur is long, sleek and glossy, sandy brown, and slightly darker brown along the spine. Individual hairs have grey bases and sandy brown shafts. The underparts are abruptly delineated from the upper parts and are pale grey, the individual hairs having darker grey bases. The limbs are short and brownish-grey, the feet having white hairs on the upper surface, except for a dark mark above the metatarsals on the hind feet. The tail is bicoloured and appears naked, being dark above and pale below.

== Distribution and habitat ==
The Ethiopian white-footed mouse is endemic to the Ethiopian highlands where it occurs on either side of the Great Rift Valley, with a separate smaller population in the mountains in the northern part of the country, where it was studied in detail in the Degua Tembien district. Its habitat is primarily upland forests and scrubland, but it also inhabits rough grassland and pasture, at an altitudinal range of between about 800 and 3,300 m (2,600 and 10,800 ft).

== Ecology ==
This species is nocturnal and mainly terrestrial, although it also scrambles around in bushes. Its diet is mainly vegetable matter, including the berries of the bush plum, olive, juniper, Abyssinian rose and Rubus spp., as well as green leaves. Breeding takes place at any time of year but peaks in the wet season, from September to November. The average litter size is four. Gestation takes 23 days and weaning takes place at 24 to 29 days. Longevity for adults may be less than one year, and the population size may be controlled by predators such as owls.

== Status ==
The Ethiopian white-footed mouse is probably the commonest rodent in the mountains of Ethiopia above 1,500 m (5,000 ft), and particularly common around 2,900 m (9,500 ft). It has a wide range and large total population. No particular threats have been identified, so the International Union for Conservation of Nature has assessed its conservation status as of "least concern".
