= Sidney Langford Hinde =

British physician (1863–1930)

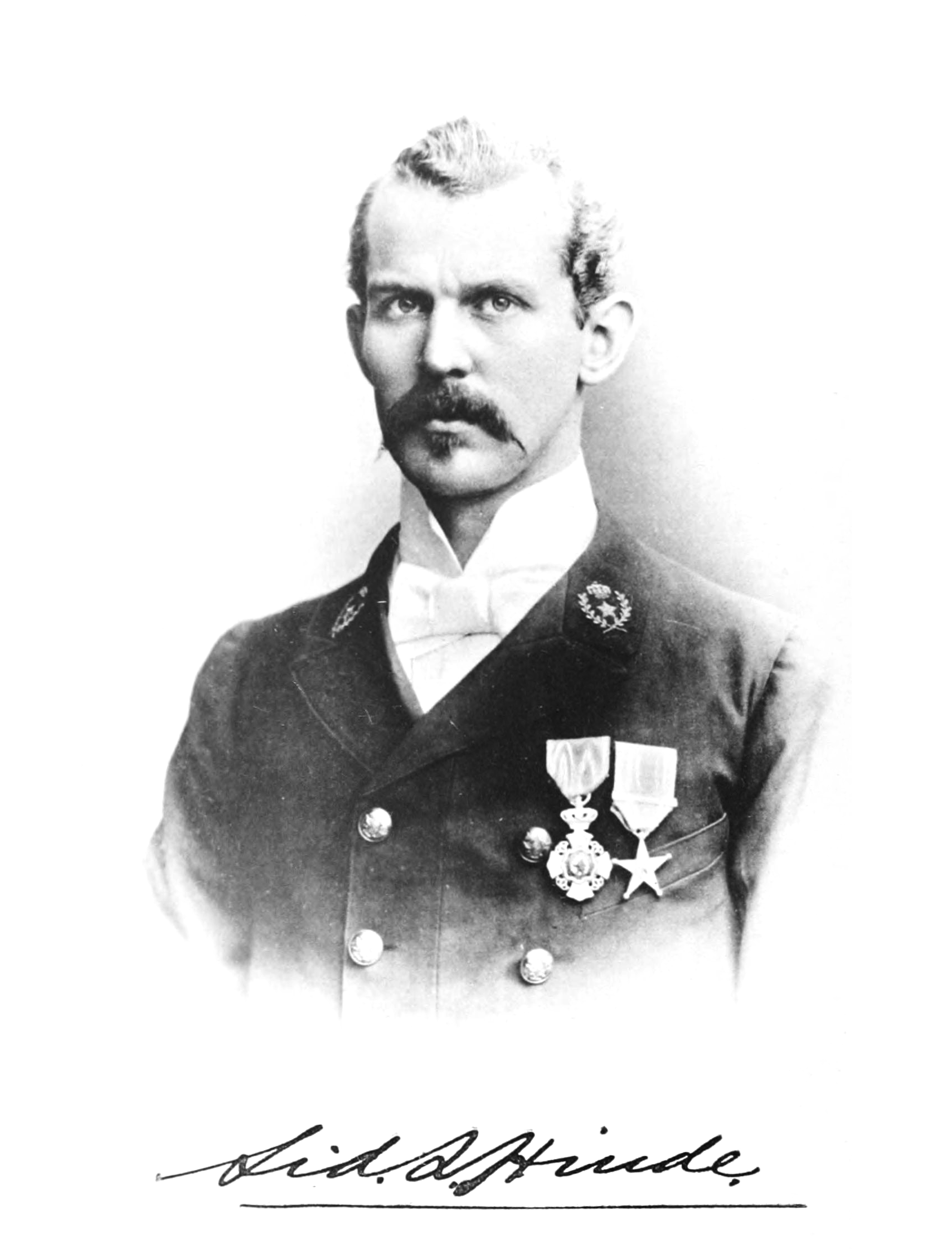
- Born: July 23, 1863; Niagara, Canada West
- Died: October 18, 1930 (aged 67); Haverfordwest, Wales
- Occupation(s): Medical doctor, British colonial administrator
- Spouse: Hildegarde Beatrice Hinde

Sidney Langford Hinde (23 July 1863 – 18 October 1930) was a medical doctor and colonial administrator in East Africa. He was involved in the Congo–Arab war in the service of King Leopold II of Belgium. He collected natural history specimens, and wrote about East African people studying their language and culture along with his wife Hildegarde Beatrice Ginsburg. He is commemorated in the scientific names of several African animals.

== Early life ==
Sidney Hinde was born at Niagara, Ontario. His father was George Langford Hinde of the Army Medical Department. The elder Hinde was a veteran of the Crimean War who retired in 1892 with the rank of Surgeon-Major-General.

Hinde studied in France and Germany before he joined Clare College, Cambridge and received his medical education at St Bartholomew's Hospital Medical College. He practiced medicine at hospitals in Stafford, England and London before entering the service of the Congo Free State.

== Career ==
=== Congo ===
He took part in the Congo–Arab war of 1892 to 1894 with the rank of captain. For part of that time he was second in command to Francis Dhanis. For his services King Leopold of Belgium awarded him the cross of the Royal Order of the Lion and the Étoile de service.

In 1894 he was involved in exploration of the Lualaba District. In 1895 he presented a paper about his experiences in the Congo Free State to the Royal Geographical Society. His book about the Congo–Arab war, entitled The Fall of the Congo Arabs, was published by Methuen & Co. in 1897. A contemporary review in The New York Times describes it as "full of interest and stirring incidents" and written with "a naturalness and a directness which are admirable".

=== Kenya ===
In 1895 Hinde began working for the British Foreign Office. He was posted to Machakos Fort in the East Africa Protectorate Service where he was appointed resident to the Maasai chief and collector of Maasailand.

In 1897 Hinde married Hildegarde Beatrice Ginsburg, a daughter of the biblical scholar Christian David Ginsburg. Her sister had married the English geographer Halford Mackinder. In his capacity as colonial administrator, then stationed in Nairobi, Hinde facilitated Mackinder's expedition to climb Mount Kenya in 1899.

Hildegarde and Sidney Hinde were joint authors of The Last of the Masai, a book published by William Heinemann in 1901. It contains field notes describing some East African animals and birds and photographs including one showing a "lion shot by Mrs. S.L. Hinde". In the book's preface Sidney Hinde explained that the word "last" in the title referred to "the last of the rapidly decreasing band of pure blood, whose tendencies, traditions, customs and beliefs remain uncontaminated by admixture with Bantu beliefs and contact with civilization".

Hinde retired from the Colonial Office in 1915. He served as a major in the Royal Army Medical Corps during World War I. He died at Haverfordwest on 18 October 1930.

== Legacy ==
Mackinder named the Hinde Valley on Mount Kenya after Sidney Hinde. Hinde Falls on the Athi River is also named after the Hindes. Hinde, an amateur naturalist and collector, contributed African artifacts and natural history specimens to the British Museum. George Albert Boulenger named a species of venomous snake Montatheris hindii in honour of Sidney Hinde.

Three species of African mammal were named in his honour by Oldfield Thomas: Hinde's lesser house bat (Scotoecus hindei), Hinde's rock rat (Aethomys hindei), and Lesser hamster-rat (Beamys hindei). Hinde's babbler (Turdoides hindei), a species of bird endemic to Kenya, was named in his honour by Richard Bowdler Sharpe in 1900.

== Bibliography ==
Hinde wrote two books and an article for an ornithological journal:

- (1897). The Fall of the Congo Arabs. London: Methuen & Co.
- (1898). "On birds observed near Machako's Station, in British East Africa". The Ibis 4: 576-587.
- (1901). The Last of the Masai. (with Hildegarde Beatrice Hinde) London: William Heinemann.
