= Stenocephalemys =

Scientific classification
- Domain: Eukaryota
- Kingdom: Animalia
- Phylum: Chordata
- Class: Mammalia
- Order: Rodentia
- Family: Muridae
- Subfamily: Murinae
- Tribe: Praomyini
- Genus: Stenocephalemys; Frick, 1914

Type species
- Stenocephalemys albocaudata

Species
- 6, see text

Genus of rodents

Stenocephalemys is a genus of rodent in the family Muridae. The genus is endemic to Ethiopia.

== Species ==
Stenocephalemys contains six described species:

- Ethiopian white-footed mouse (Stenocephalemys albipes) (Rüppell, 1842)
- Ethiopian narrow-headed rat (Stenocephalemys albocaudata) Frick, 1914
- Gray-tailed narrow-headed rat (Stenocephalemys griseicauda) F. Petter, 1972
- Rupp's mouse (Stenocephalemys ruppi) Van der Straeten & Dieterlen, 1983
- Stenocephalemys sokolovi Lavrenchenko & Bryja, 2020
- Stenocephalemys zimai Lavrenchenko & Bryja, 2020
