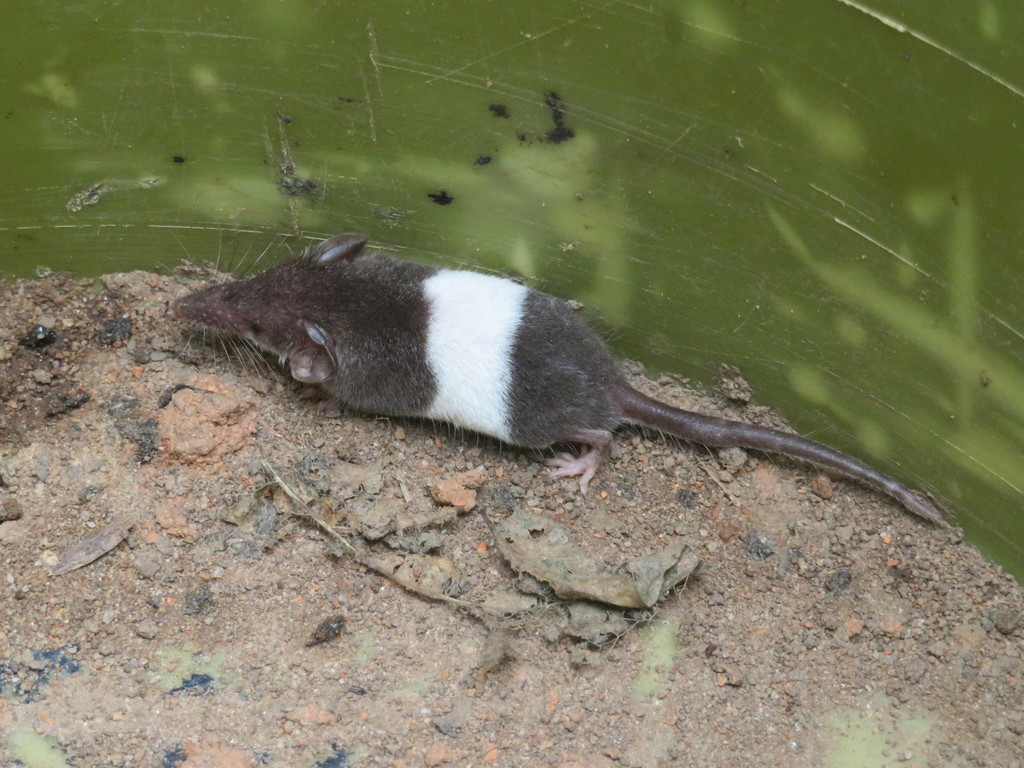

Conservation status
- Least Concern (IUCN 3.1)

Scientific classification
- Kingdom: Animalia
- Phylum: Chordata
- Class: Mammalia
- Order: Eulipotyphla
- Family: Soricidae
- Genus: Crocidura
- Species: C. hildegardeae

Binomial name
- Crocidura hildegardeae Thomas, 1904
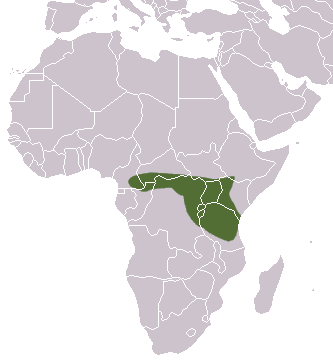
- Hildegarde's shrew range

= Hildegarde's shrew =

Species of mammal

Hildegarde's shrew (Crocidura hildegardeae) is a recently discovered shrew, described in 1904. Considered by some authorities to be a subspecies of the Peters's musk shrew, it is now recognised as a separate species, with a diploid chromosome number of 2n = 52.

This is one of three species of small mammals named by the British zoologist Oldfield Thomas in honour of anthropologist Hildegarde Beatrice Hinde.

== Description ==
Hildegarde's shrew is a moderate-sized species with a head-and-body length of about 70 mm (2.8 in), males being slightly larger than females. The hairs on the back, which are longer on the rump than elsewhere, are mid-brown with darker tips, giving an overall pelage the colour of milk chocolate. The underparts are pale brown, and the limbs are dark brown, with the exception of the inner side of the hind limbs which are yellowish-brown. The tail is long (about 70% of the head-and-body length) and is partially furred, being black above and brown below.

== Distribution and habitat ==
This Central and East African species is known from Cameroon and north of the River Congo in the Republic of the Congo and the Democratic Republic of the Congo, eastwards to Kenya and Tanzania. It is plentiful in dry forests in upland and montane areas, being the most common shrew species at 1,100 m (3,600 ft) in Tanzania, but is less frequent in moist forests. In Rwanda, its habitats include moist savanna and cultivated areas. It occurs in both primary forest and secondary growth. The International Union for Conservation of Nature has assessed its conservation status as being of "least concern".

== Ecology ==
This shrew is nocturnal. Breeding takes place in July and August, with litters typically numbering two young. The predators of this shrew include small carnivorous mammals and the viper Atheris nitschei.
