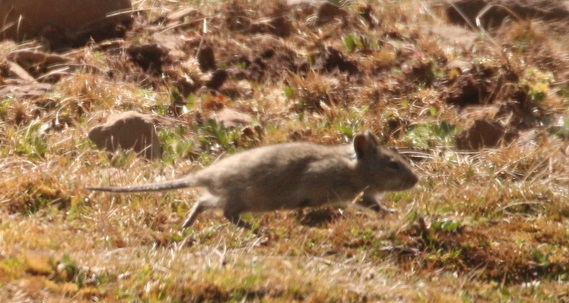

Conservation status
- Least Concern (IUCN 3.1)

Scientific classification
- Kingdom: Animalia
- Phylum: Chordata
- Class: Mammalia
- Order: Rodentia
- Family: Muridae
- Genus: Stenocephalemys
- Species: S. albocaudata

Binomial name
- Stenocephalemys albocaudata Frick, 1914

= Ethiopian narrow-headed rat =

Species of rodent

The Ethiopian narrow-headed rat (Stenocephalemys albocaudata) is a species of rodent in the family Muridae. It is found only in Ethiopia. Its natural habitats are subtropical or tropical high-elevation shrubland and subtropical or tropical high-elevation grassland.
