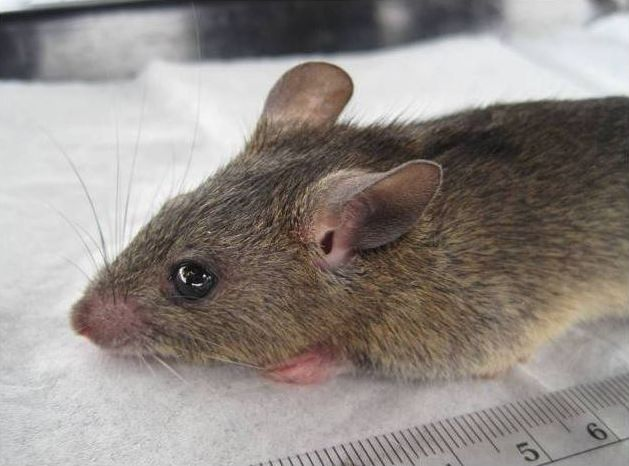
- Ethiopian white-footed mouse (Stenocephalemys albipes)

Scientific classification
- Kingdom: Animalia
- Phylum: Chordata
- Class: Mammalia
- Order: Rodentia
- Family: Muridae
- Subfamily: Murinae
- Tribe: Praomyini; Lecompte et al., 2008

Genera
- Chingawaemys; Colomys; Congomys; Heimyscus; Hylomyscus; Mastomys; Montemys; Myomyscus; Nilopegamys; Ochromyscus; Praomys; Serengetimys; Stenocephalemys; Zelotomys

= Praomyini =

Praomyini Temporal range: Late Miocene - present, 11–0 Ma

Tribe of rodents

Praomyini is a tribe of muroid rodents in the subfamily Murinae. Species in this tribe are found mostly throughout Sub-Saharan Africa, but one species (Mastomys erythroleucus) is found in North Africa, and another (Ochromyscus yemeni) is found in the Arabian Peninsula.

== Species ==
=== Recent species ===
Species in the tribe include:

- Genus Chingawaemys
  - Chingawa forest rat, Chingawaemys rarus
- Genus Colomys
  - African wading rat, Colomys goslingi
  - Colomys wologizi
  - Colomys lumumbai
  - Colomys eisentrauti
- Genus Congomys
  - Lukolela swamp rat, Congomys lukolelae
  - Verschuren's swamp rat, Congomys verschureni
- Genus Heimyscus
  - African smoky mouse, Heimyscus fumosus
- Genus Hylomyscus - African wood mice
  - H. aeta group
    - Beaded wood mouse, Hylomyscus aeta
    - Hylomyscus grandis
  - H. alleni group
    - Allen's wood mouse, Hylomyscus alleni
    - Angolan wood mouse, Hylomyscus carillus
    - Stella wood mouse, Hylomyscus stella
    - Walter Verheyen's mouse, Hylomyscus walterverheyeni
  - H. anselli group
    - Ansell's wood mouse, Hylomyscus anselli
    - Arc Mountain wood mouse, Hylomyscus arcimontensis
  - H. baeri group
    - Baer's wood mouse, Hylomyscus baeri
  - H. denniae group
    - Montane wood mouse, Hylomyscus denniae
    - Small-footed forest mouse, Hylomyscus endorobae
    - Hylomyscus vulcanorum
  - H. parvus group
    - Little wood mouse, Hylomyscus parvus
- Genus Mastomys - multimammate rats
  - Angolan multimammate mouse, Mastomys angolensis
  - Awash multimammate mouse, Mastomys awashensis
  - Southern multimammate mouse, Mastomys coucha
  - Guinea multimammate mouse, Mastomys erythroleucus
  - Hubert's multimammate mouse, Mastomys huberti
  - Verheyen's multimammate mouse, Mastomys kollmannspergeri
  - Natal multimammate mouse, Mastomys natalensis
  - Shortridge's multimammate mouse, Mastomys shortridgei
- Genus Montemys
  - Delectable soft-furred mouse, Montemys delectorum
- Genus Myomyscus
  - Verreaux's mouse, Myomyscus verreauxii
- Genus Nilopegamys
  - Ethiopian amphibious rat, Nilopegamys plumbeus (possibly extinct)
- Genus Ochromyscus - rock mice
  - Brockman's rock mouse or Brockman's white-footed rat, Ochromyscus brockmani
  - Yemeni mouse, Ochromyscus yemeni
- Genus Praomys - African soft-furred rats
  - Praomys coetzeei
  - Dalton's mouse, Praomys daltoni
  - De Graaff's soft-furred mouse, Praomys degraaffi
  - Deroo's mouse, Praomys derooi
  - Hartwig's soft-furred mouse, Praomys hartwigi
  - Jackson's soft-furred mouse, Praomys jacksoni
  - Least soft-furred mouse, Praomys minor
  - Misonne's soft-furred mouse, Praomys misonnei
  - Cameroon soft-furred mouse, Praomys morio
  - Muton's soft-furred mouse, Praomys mutoni
  - Gotel Mountain soft-furred mouse, Praomys obscurus
  - Peter's soft-furred mouse, Praomys petteri
  - Forest soft-furred mouse, Praomys rostratus
  - Tullberg's soft-furred mouse, Praomys tullbergi
- Genus Serengetimys
  - Dwarf multimammate mouse, Serengetimys pernanus
- Genus Stenocephalemys - Ethiopian narrow-headed rats
  - Ethiopian white-footed mouse, Stenocephalemys albipes
  - Ethiopian narrow-headed rat, Stenocephalemys albocaudata
  - Gray-tailed narrow-headed rat, Stenocephalemys griseicauda
  - Rupp's mouse, Stenocephalemys ruppi
- Genus Zelotomys - stink mice
  - Hildegarde's broad-headed mouse, Zelotomys hildegardeae
  - Woosnam's broad-headed mouse, Zelotomys woosnami
