= List of mammals of the Republic of the Congo =

This is a list of the mammal species recorded in the Republic of the Congo. Of the mammal species in the Republic of the Congo, five are endangered, nine are vulnerable, and four are near threatened.

The following tags are used to highlight each species' conservation status as assessed by the International Union for Conservation of Nature:

EX	Extinct	No reasonable doubt that the last individual has died.
EW	Extinct in the wild	Known only to survive in captivity or as a naturalized populations well outside its previous range.
CR	Critically endangered	The species is in imminent risk of extinction in the wild.
EN	Endangered	The species is facing an extremely high risk of extinction in the wild.
VU	Vulnerable	The species is facing a high risk of extinction in the wild.
NT	Near threatened	The species does not meet any of the criteria that would categorise it as risking extinction but it is likely to do so in the future.
LC	Least concern	There are no current identifiable risks to the species.
DD	Data deficient	There is inadequate information to make an assessment of the risks to this species.

Some species were assessed using an earlier set of criteria. Species assessed using this system have the following instead of near threatened and least concern categories:

LR/cd	Lower risk/conservation dependent	Species which were the focus of conservation programmes and may have moved into a higher risk category if that programme was discontinued.
LR/nt	Lower risk/near threatened	Species which are close to being classified as vulnerable but are not the subject of conservation programmes.
LR/lc	Lower risk/least concern	Species for which there are no identifiable risks.

== Order: Tubulidentata (aardvarks) ==
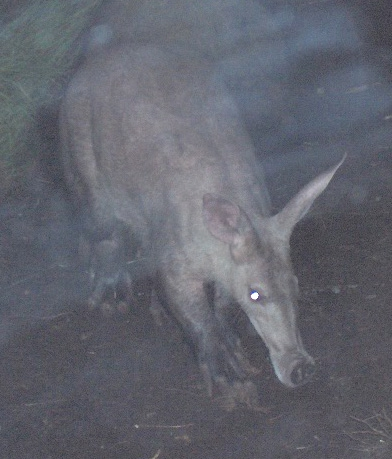
Aardvark

The order Tubulidentata consists of a single species, the aardvark. Tubulidentata are characterised by their teeth which lack a pulp cavity and form thin tubes which are continuously worn down and replaced.

- Family: Orycteropodidae
  - Genus: Orycteropus
    - Aardvark, O. afer LC

== Order: Afrosoricida (tenrecs and golden moles) ==
The order Afrosoricida contains the golden moles of southern Africa and the tenrecs of Madagascar and Africa, two families of small mammals that were traditionally part of the order Insectivora.

- Family: Tenrecidae (tenrecs)
  - Subfamily: Potamogalinae
    - Genus: Potamogale
      - Giant otter shrew, Potamogale velox LC
- Family: Chrysochloridae
  - Subfamily: Amblysominae
    - Genus: Calcochloris
      - Congo golden mole, Calcochloris leucorhinus DD

== Order: Hyracoidea (hyraxes) ==
The hyraxes are any of four species of fairly small, thickset, herbivorous mammals in the order Hyracoidea. About the size of a domestic cat they are well-furred, with rounded bodies and a stumpy tail. They are native to Africa and the Middle East.

- Family: Procaviidae (hyraxes)
  - Genus: Dendrohyrax
    - Western tree hyrax, D. dorsalis LC

== Order: Proboscidea (elephants) ==
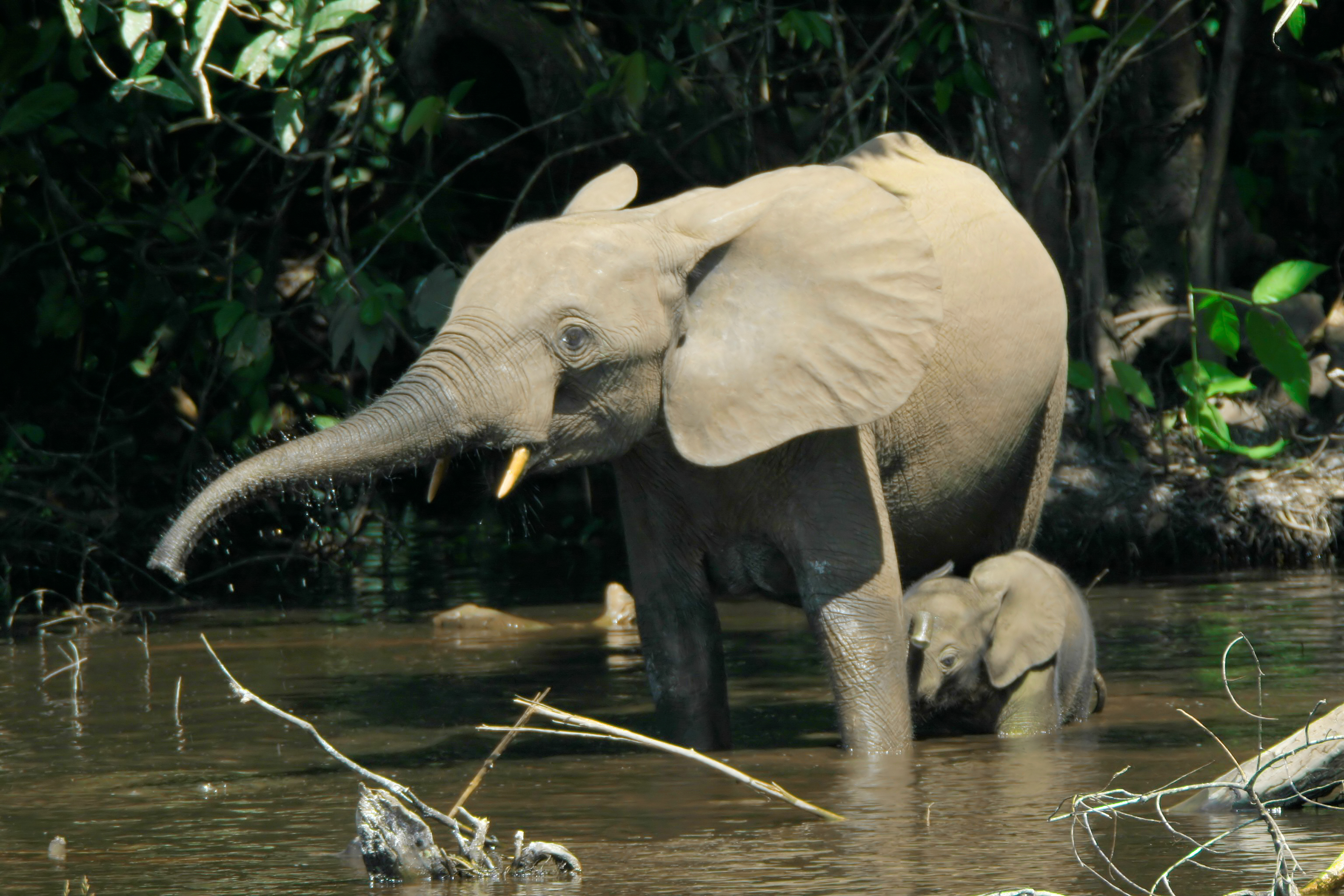
African forest elephant in the Congo Basin

The elephants comprise three living species and are the largest living terrestrial animals.

- Family: Elephantidae (elephants)
  - Genus: Loxodonta
    - African forest elephant, L. cyclotis CR

== Order: Sirenia (manatees and dugongs) ==
Sirenia is an order of fully aquatic, herbivorous mammals that inhabit rivers, estuaries, coastal marine waters, swamps, and marine wetlands. All four species are endangered.

- Family: Trichechidae
  - Genus: Trichechus
    - African manatee, Trichechus senegalensis VU

== Order: Primates ==
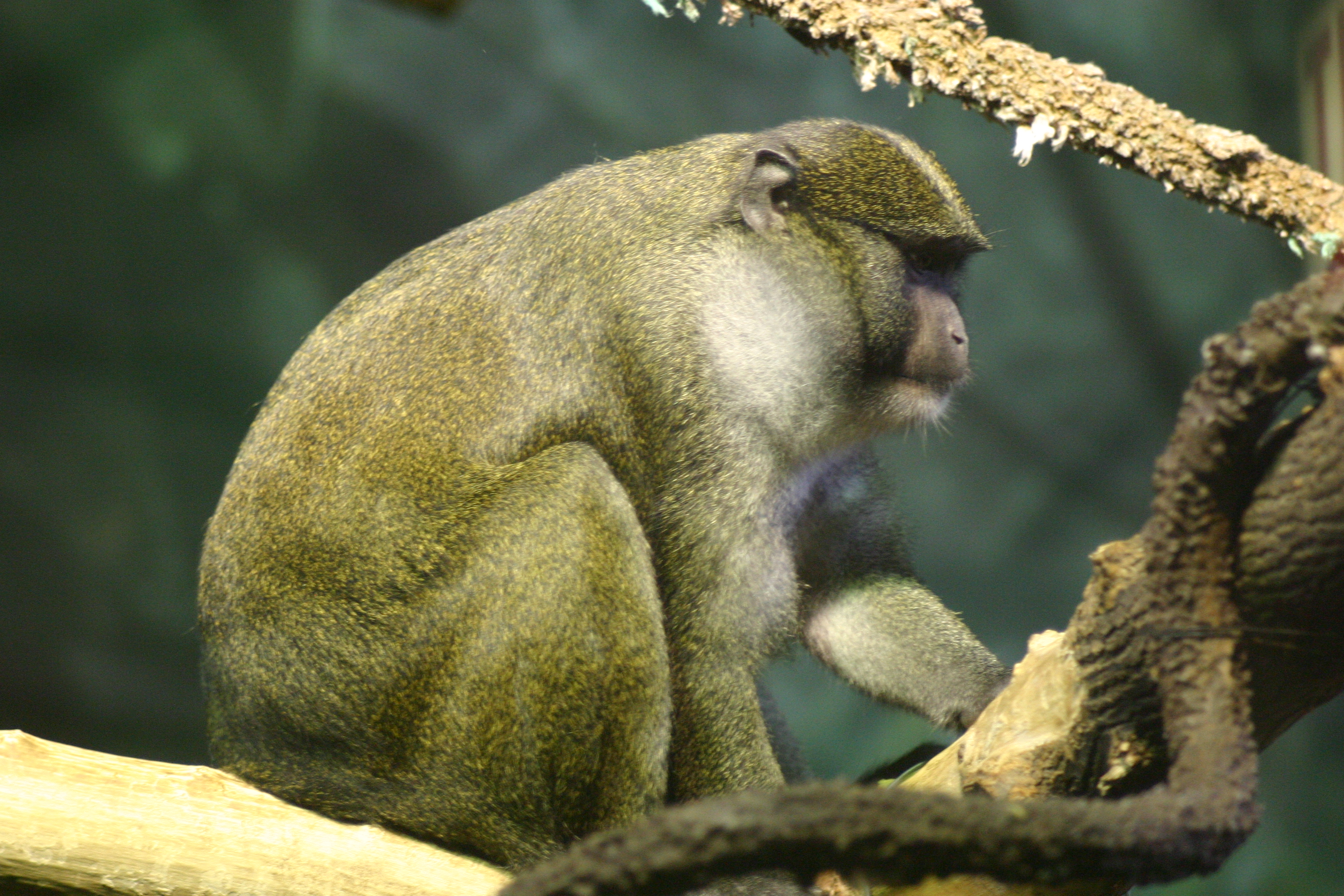
Allen's swamp monkey

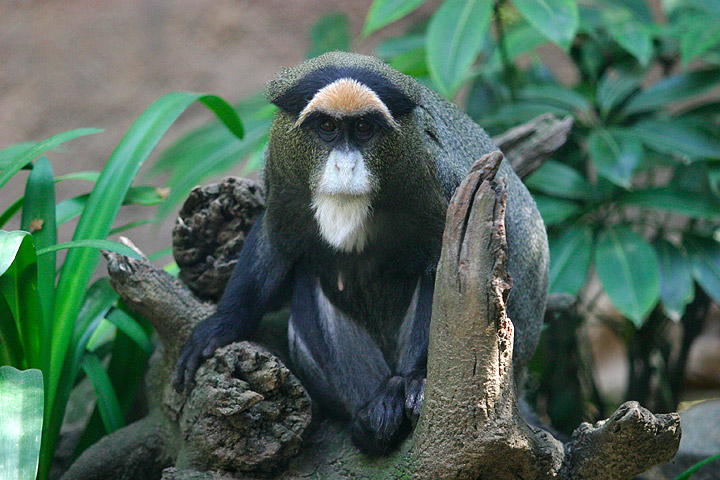
De Brazza's monkey

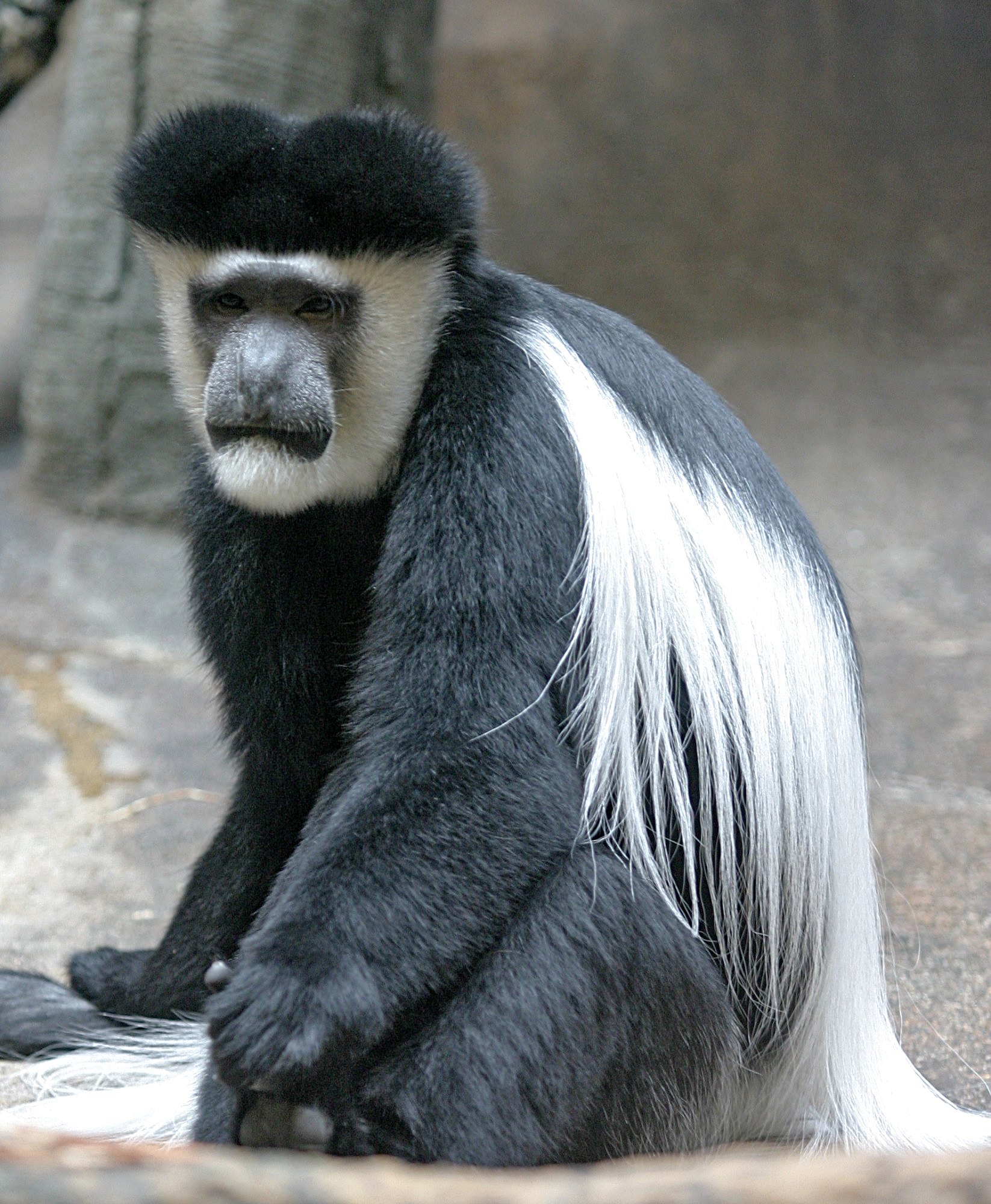
Mantled guereza

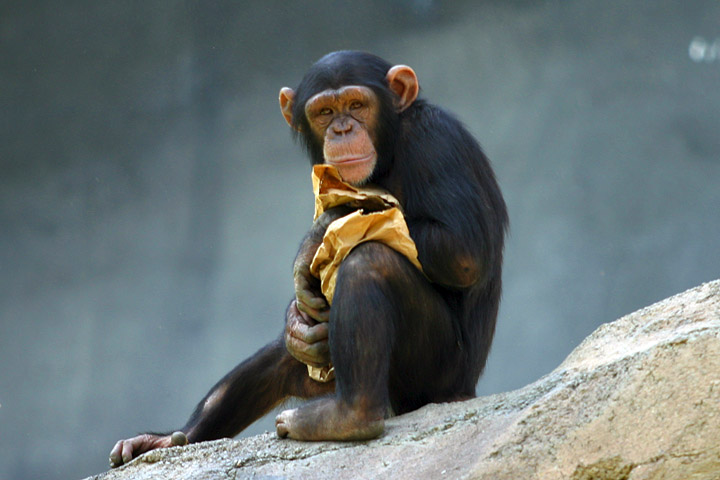
Common chimpanzee

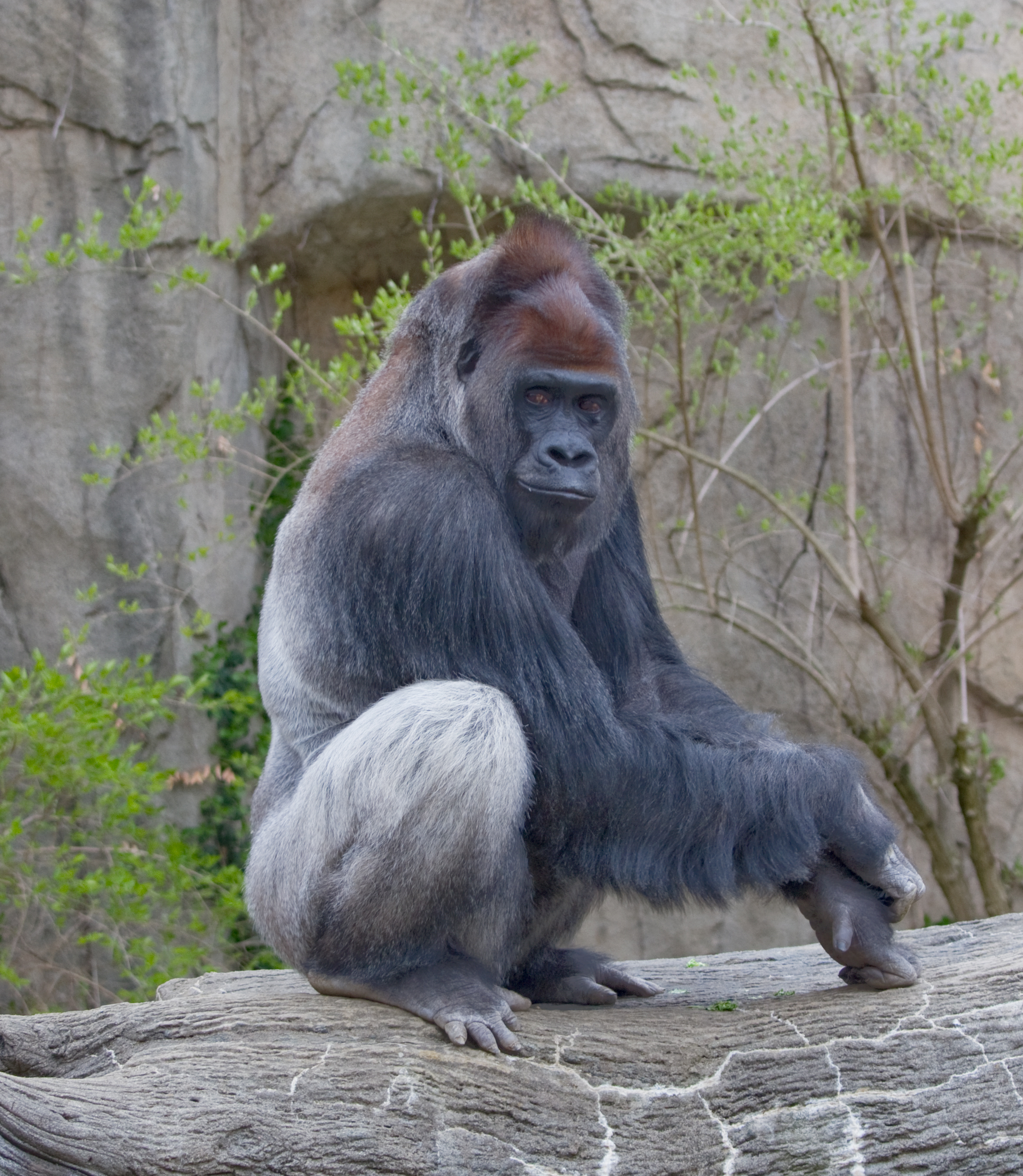
Western lowland gorilla

The order Primates contains humans and their closest relatives: lemurs, lorisoids, tarsiers, monkeys, and apes.

- Suborder: Strepsirrhini
  - Infraorder: Lemuriformes
    - Superfamily: Lorisoidea
      - Family: Lorisidae
        - Genus: Arctocebus
          - Golden angwantibo, Arctocebus aureus LR/nt
        - Genus: Perodicticus
          - Potto, Perodicticus potto LR/lc
      - Family: Galagidae
        - Genus: Sciurocheirus
          - Bioko Allen's bushbaby, Sciurocheirus alleni LR/nt
        - Genus: Galagoides
          - Prince Demidoff's bushbaby, Galagoides demidovii LR/lc
        - Genus: Euoticus
          - Southern needle-clawed bushbaby, Euoticus elegantulus LR/nt
- Suborder: Haplorhini
  - Infraorder: Simiiformes
    - Parvorder: Catarrhini
      - Superfamily: Cercopithecoidea
        - Family: Cercopithecidae (Old World monkeys)
          - Genus: Allenopithecus
            - Allen's swamp monkey, Allenopithecus nigroviridis LR/nt
          - Genus: Miopithecus
            - Angolan talapoin, Miopithecus talapoin LR/lc
            - Gabon talapoin, Miopithecus ogouensis LR/lc
          - Genus: Chlorocebus
            - Malbrouck, Chlorocebus cynosuros LR/lc
          - Genus: Cercopithecus
            - Moustached guenon, Cercopithecus cephus LR/lc
            - De Brazza's monkey, Cercopithecus neglectus LR/lc
            - Greater spot-nosed monkey, Cercopithecus nictitans LR/lc
            - Crowned guenon, Cercopithecus pogonias LR/lc
          - Genus: Lophocebus
            - Grey-cheeked mangabey, Lophocebus albigena LR/lc
          - Genus: Papio
            - Olive baboon, Papio anubis LR/lc
          - Genus: Cercocebus
            - Collared mangabey, Cercocebus torquatus LR/nt
          - Genus: Mandrillus
            - Mandrill, Mandrillus sphinx VU
          - Subfamily: Colobinae
            - Genus: Colobus
              - Mantled guereza, Colobus guereza LR/lc
              - Black colobus, Colobus satanas VU
            - Genus: Procolobus
              - Red colobus, Procolobus badius EN
              - Pennant's colobus, Procolobus pennantii EN
      - Superfamily: Hominoidea
        - Family: Hominidae (great apes)
          - Subfamily: Homininae
            - Tribe: Gorillini
              - Genus: Gorilla
                - Western gorilla, Gorilla gorilla EN
            - Tribe: Panini
              - Genus: Pan
                - Common chimpanzee, Pan troglodytes EN

== Order: Rodentia (rodents) ==
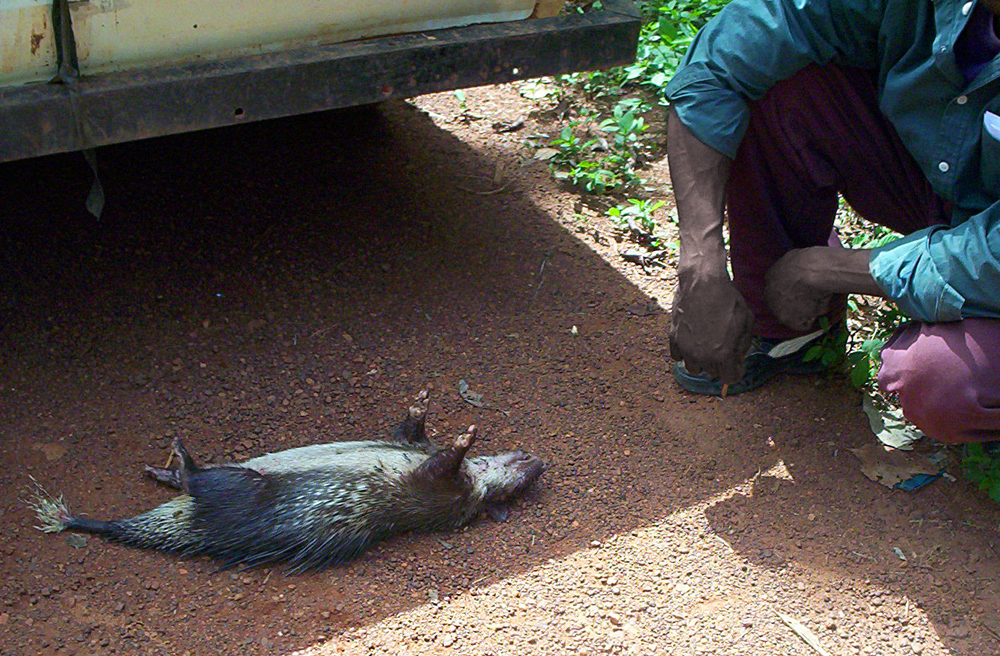
African brush-tailed porcupine

Rodents make up the largest order of mammals, with over 40% of mammalian species. They have two incisors in the upper and lower jaw which grow continually and must be kept short by gnawing. Most rodents are small though the capybara can weigh up to 45 kg (99 lb).

- Suborder: Hystricognathi
  - Family: Hystricidae (Old World porcupines)
    - Genus: Atherurus
      - African brush-tailed porcupine, Atherurus africanus LC
    - Genus: Hystrix
      - Cape porcupine, Hystrix africaeaustralis LC
  - Family: Thryonomyidae (cane rats)
    - Genus: Thryonomys
      - Greater cane rat, Thryonomys swinderianus LC
- Suborder: Sciurognathi
  - Family: Anomaluridae
    - Subfamily: Anomalurinae
      - Genus: Anomalurus
        - Lord Derby's scaly-tailed squirrel, Anomalurus derbianus LC
        - Dwarf scaly-tailed squirrel, Anomalurus pusillus LC
      - Genus: Anomalurops
        - Beecroft's scaly-tailed squirrel, Anomalurops beecrofti LC
    - Subfamily: Zenkerellinae
      - Genus: Idiurus
        - Long-eared flying mouse, Idiurus macrotis LC
        - Flying mouse, Idiurus zenkeri DD
  - Family: Sciuridae (squirrels)
    - Subfamily: Xerinae
      - Tribe: Protoxerini
        - Genus: Epixerus
          - Biafran palm squirrel, Epixerus wilsoni DD
        - Genus: Funisciurus
          - Lady Burton's rope squirrel, Funisciurus isabella LC
          - Ribboned rope squirrel, Funisciurus lemniscatus DD
          - Fire-footed rope squirrel, Funisciurus pyrropus LC
        - Genus: Myosciurus
          - African pygmy squirrel, Myosciurus pumilio DD
        - Genus: Paraxerus
          - Green bush squirrel, Paraxerus poensis LC
        - Genus: Protoxerus
          - Forest giant squirrel, Protoxerus stangeri LC
  - Family: Nesomyidae
    - Subfamily: Dendromurinae
      - Genus: Dendroprionomys
        - Velvet climbing mouse, Dendroprionomys rousseloti DD
    - Subfamily: Cricetomyinae
      - Genus: Cricetomys
        - Emin's pouched rat, Cricetomys emini LC
        - Gambian pouched rat, Cricetomys gambianus LC
  - Family: Muridae (mice, rats, voles, gerbils, hamsters, etc.)
    - Subfamily: Deomyinae
      - Genus: Deomys
        - Link rat, Deomys ferrugineus LC
      - Genus: Lophuromys
        - Yellow-bellied brush-furred rat, Lophuromys luteogaster LC
        - Fire-bellied brush-furred rat, Lophuromys nudicaudus LC
        - Rusty-bellied brush-furred rat, Lophuromys sikapusi LC
    - Subfamily: Murinae
      - Genus: Colomys
        - African wading rat, Colomys goslingi LC
      - Genus: Grammomys
        - Shining thicket rat, Grammomys rutilans LC
      - Genus: Heimyscus
        - African smoky mouse, Heimyscus fumosus LC
      - Genus: Hybomys
        - Peters's striped mouse, Hybomys univittatus LC
      - Genus: Hylomyscus
        - Beaded wood mouse, Hylomyscus aeta LC
        - Allen's wood mouse, Hylomyscus alleni LC
        - Little wood mouse, Hylomyscus parvus LC
        - Stella wood mouse, Hylomyscus stella LC
      - Genus: Lemniscomys
        - Typical striped grass mouse, Lemniscomys striatus LC
      - Genus: Malacomys
        - Big-eared swamp rat, Malacomys longipes LC
      - Genus: Mastomys
        - Guinea multimammate mouse, Mastomys erythroleucus LC
        - Natal multimammate mouse, Mastomys natalensis LC
      - Genus: Mus
        - African pygmy mouse, Mus minutoides LC
        - Peters's mouse, Mus setulosus LC
        - Thomas's pygmy mouse, Mus sorella LC
      - Genus: Mylomys
        - African groove-toothed rat, Mylomys dybowskii LC
      - Genus: Myomyscus
        - Brockman's rock mouse, Myomyscus brockmani LC
      - Genus: Oenomys
        - Common rufous-nosed rat, Oenomys hypoxanthus LC
      - Genus: Praomys
        - Jackson's soft-furred mouse, Praomys jacksoni LC
        - Petter's soft-furred mouse, Praomys petteri LC
        - Tullberg's soft-furred mouse, Praomys tullbergi LC
      - Genus: Stochomys
        - Target rat, Stochomys longicaudatus LC

== Order: Soricomorpha (shrews, moles, and solenodons) ==
The "shrew-forms" are insectivorous mammals. The shrews and solenodons closely resemble mice while the moles are stout-bodied burrowers.

- Family: Soricidae (shrews)
  - Subfamily: Crocidurinae
    - Genus: Crocidura
      - Bates's shrew, Crocidura batesi LC
      - Long-footed shrew, Crocidura crenata LC
      - Dent's shrew, Crocidura denti LC
      - Long-tailed musk shrew, Crocidura dolichura LC
      - Goliath shrew, Crocidura goliath LC
      - Grasse's shrew, Crocidura grassei LC
      - Hildegarde's shrew, Crocidura hildegardeae LC
      - Butiaba naked-tailed shrew, Crocidura littoralis LC
      - Ludia's shrew, Crocidura ludia LC
      - Turbo shrew, Crocidura turba LC
    - Genus: Paracrocidura
      - Lesser large-headed shrew, Paracrocidura schoutedeni LC
    - Genus: Suncus
      - Remy's pygmy shrew, Suncus remyi LC
    - Genus: Sylvisorex
      - Johnston's forest shrew, Sylvisorex johnstoni LC
      - Climbing shrew, Sylvisorex megalura LC
      - Greater forest shrew, Sylvisorex ollula LC
  - Subfamily: Myosoricinae
    - Genus: Congosorex
      - Lesser Congo shrew, Congosorex verheyeni LC

== Order: Chiroptera (bats) ==
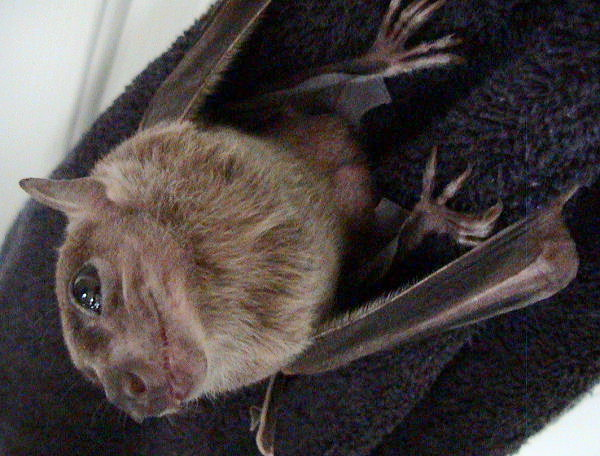
Egyptian fruit bat

The bats' most distinguishing feature is that their forelimbs are developed as wings, making them the only mammals capable of flight. Bat species account for about 20% of all mammals.

- Family: Pteropodidae (flying foxes, Old World fruit bats)
  - Subfamily: Pteropodinae
    - Genus: Eidolon
      - Straw-coloured fruit bat, Eidolon helvum LC
    - Genus: Epomophorus
      - Lesser Angolan epauletted fruit bat, Epomophorus grandis DD
      - Ethiopian epauletted fruit bat, Epomophorus labiatus LC
      - Wahlberg's epauletted fruit bat, Epomophorus wahlbergi LC
    - Genus: Epomops
      - Franquet's epauletted fruit bat, Epomops franqueti LC
    - Genus: Hypsignathus
      - Hammer-headed bat, Hypsignathus monstrosus LC
    - Genus: Lissonycteris
      - Angolan rousette, Lissonycteris angolensis LC
    - Genus: Micropteropus
      - Peters's dwarf epauletted fruit bat, Micropteropus pusillus LC
    - Genus: Myonycteris
      - Little collared fruit bat, Myonycteris torquata LC
    - Genus: Rousettus
      - Egyptian fruit bat, Rousettus aegyptiacus LC
    - Genus: Scotonycteris
      - Pohle's fruit bat, Scotonycteris ophiodon EN
      - Zenker's fruit bat, Scotonycteris zenkeri NT
  - Subfamily: Macroglossinae
    - Genus: Megaloglossus
      - Woermann's bat, Megaloglossus woermanni LC
- Family: Vespertilionidae
  - Subfamily: Myotinae
    - Genus: Myotis
      - Rufous mouse-eared bat, Myotis bocagii LC
  - Subfamily: Vespertilioninae
    - Genus: Glauconycteris
      - Silvered bat, Glauconycteris argentata LC
      - Bibundi bat, Glauconycteris egeria DD
      - Butterfly bat, Glauconycteris variegata LC
    - Genus: Hypsugo
      - Broad-headed pipistrelle, Hypsugo crassulus LC
      - Mouselike pipistrelle, Hypsugo musciculus DD
    - Genus: Mimetillus
      - Moloney's mimic bat, Mimetillus moloneyi LC
    - Genus: Neoromicia
      - Cape serotine, Neoromicia capensis LC
      - Tiny serotine, Neoromicia guineensis LC
      - Banana pipistrelle, Neoromicia nanus LC
      - Rendall's serotine, Neoromicia rendalli LC
      - Somali serotine, Neoromicia somalicus LC
      - White-winged serotine, Neoromicia tenuipinnis LC
    - Genus: Scotoecus
      - Hinde's lesser house bat, Scotoecus hindei DD
    - Genus: Scotophilus
      - African yellow bat, Scotophilus dinganii LC
  - Subfamily: Miniopterinae
    - Genus: Miniopterus
      - Least long-fingered bat, Miniopterus minor NT
- Family: Molossidae
  - Genus: Chaerephon
    - Nigerian free-tailed bat, Chaerephon nigeriae LC
    - Little free-tailed bat, Chaerephon pumila LC
  - Genus: Mops
    - Sierra Leone free-tailed bat, Mops brachypterus LC
    - Railer bat, Mops thersites LC
- Family: Emballonuridae
  - Genus: Coleura
    - African sheath-tailed bat, Coleura afra LC
  - Genus: Saccolaimus
    - Pel's pouched bat, Saccolaimus peli NT
  - Genus: Taphozous
    - Mauritian tomb bat, Taphozous mauritianus LC
- Family: Nycteridae
  - Genus: Nycteris
    - Bate's slit-faced bat, Nycteris arge LC
    - Large slit-faced bat, Nycteris grandis LC
    - Hairy slit-faced bat, Nycteris hispida LC
    - Large-eared slit-faced bat, Nycteris macrotis LC
    - Egyptian slit-faced bat, Nycteris thebaica LC
- Family: Rhinolophidae
  - Subfamily: Rhinolophinae
    - Genus: Rhinolophus
      - Adam's horseshoe bat, Rhinolophus adami DD
      - Halcyon horseshoe bat, Rhinolophus alcyone LC
      - Rüppell's horseshoe bat, Rhinolophus fumigatus LC
      - Lander's horseshoe bat, Rhinolophus landeri LC
      - Forest horseshoe bat, Rhinolophus silvestris VU
      - Swinny's horseshoe bat, Rhinolophus swinnyi NT
  - Subfamily: Hipposiderinae
    - Genus: Hipposideros
      - Benito roundleaf bat, Hipposideros beatus LC
      - Sundevall's roundleaf bat, Hipposideros caffer LC
      - Cyclops roundleaf bat, Hipposideros cyclops LC
      - Giant roundleaf bat, Hipposideros gigas LC
      - Noack's roundleaf bat, Hipposideros ruber LC
    - Genus: Triaenops
      - Persian trident bat, Triaenops persicus LC

== Order: Pholidota (pangolins) ==
The order Pholidota comprises the eight species of pangolin. Pangolins have the powerful claws, elongated snout and long tongue seen in the other unrelated anteater species.

- Family: Manidae
  - Genus: Manis
    - Giant pangolin, Manis gigantea LR/lc
    - Long-tailed pangolin, Manis tetradactyla LR/lc
    - Tree pangolin, Manis tricuspis LR/lc

== Order: Cetacea (whales and dolphins and porpoises) ==
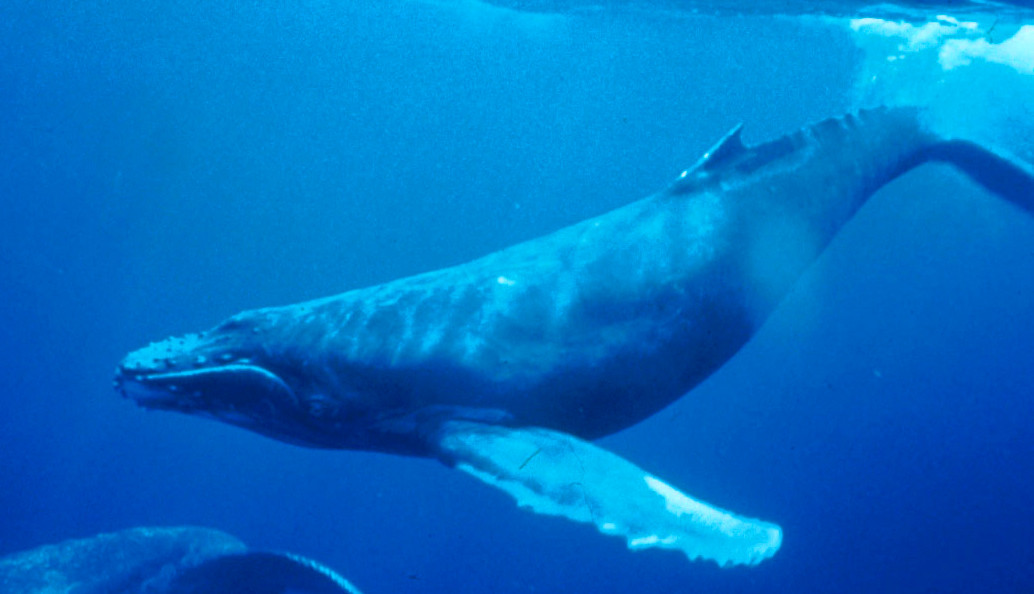
Humpback whale

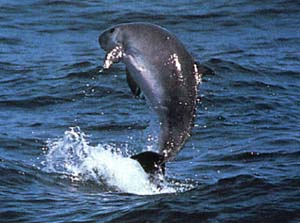
Dwarf sperm whale

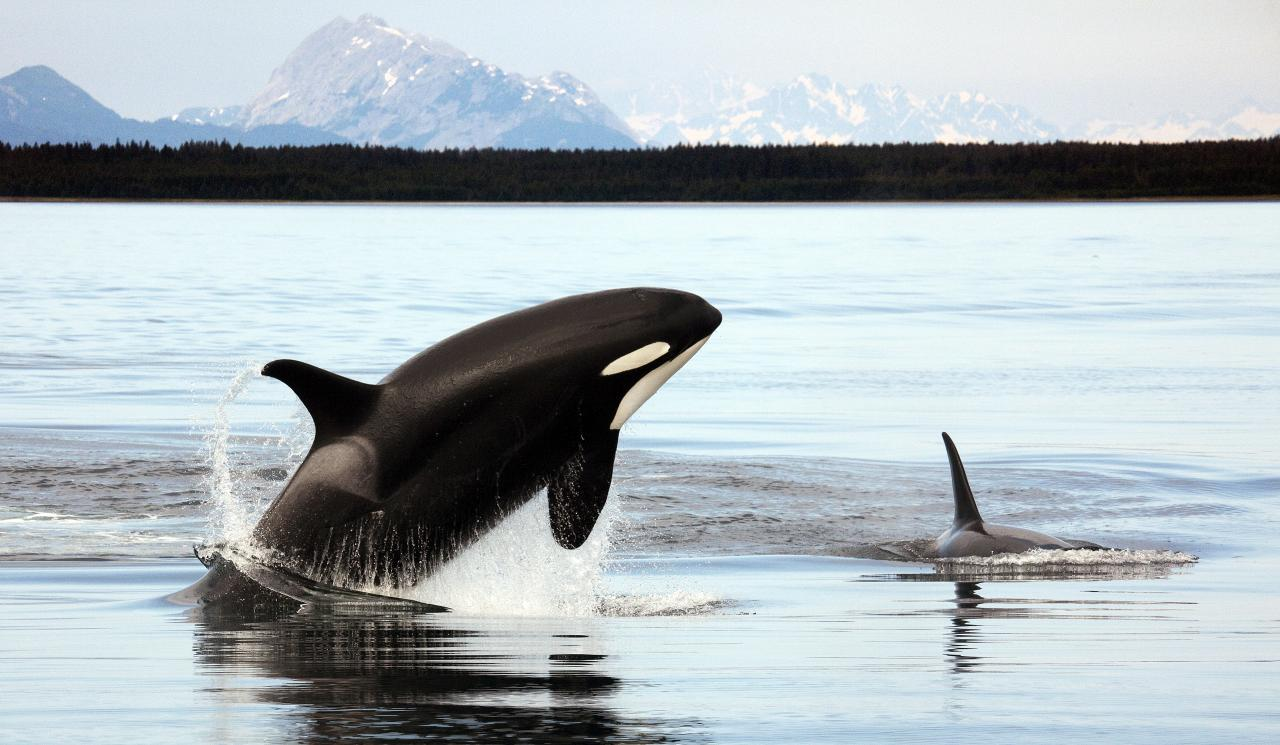
Orca

The order Cetacea includes whales, dolphins and porpoises. They are the mammals most fully adapted to aquatic life with a spindle-shaped nearly hairless body, protected by a thick layer of blubber, and forelimbs and tail modified to provide propulsion underwater.

- Suborder: Mysticeti
  - Family: Balaenopteridae
    - Subfamily: Megapterinae
      - Genus: Megaptera
        - Humpback whale, Megaptera novaeangliae LC (possibly not as abundant as other populations)
    - Subfamily: Balaenopterinae
      - Genus: Balaenoptera
        - Blue whale, Balaenoptera m. musculus intermedia EN
        - Southern fin whale, Balaenoptera physalus quoyi EN
        - Southern sei whale, Balaenoptera borealis schlegelii EN
        - Bryde's whale, Balaenoptera edeni DD
        - Antarctic minke whale, Balaenoptera bonaerensis DD
        - Common minke whale, Balaenoptera acutorostrata LR/nt
- Suborder: Odontoceti
  - Family: Physeteridae
    - Genus: Physeter
      - Sperm whale, Physeter macrocephalus VU
  - Superfamily: Platanistoidea
    - Family: Kogiidae
      - Genus: Kogia
        - Pygmy sperm whale, Kogia breviceps DD
        - Dwarf sperm whale, Kogia sima DD
    - Family: Delphinidae (marine dolphins)
      - Genus: Stenella
        - Pantropical spotted dolphin, Stenella attenuata DD
        - Clymene dolphin, Stenella clymene DD
        - Striped dolphin, Stenella coeruleoalba DD
        - Atlantic spotted dolphin, Stenella frontalis DD
        - Spinner dolphin, Stenella longirostris DD
      - Genus: Steno
        - Rough-toothed dolphin, Steno bredanensis DD
      - Genus: Sousa
        - Atlantic humpback dolphin, Sousa teuszii NT (now rare)
      - Genus: Tursiops
        - Common bottlenose dolphin, Tursiops truncatus DD
      - Genus: Lagenodelphis
        - Fraser's dolphin, Lagenodelphis hosei DD
      - Genus: Feresa
        - Pygmy killer whale, Feresa attenuata DD
      - Genus: Pseudorca
        - False killer whale, Pseudorca crassidens DD
      - Genus: Globicephala
        - Short-finned pilot whale, Globicephala macrorhynchus DD
      - Genus: Orcinus
        - Orca, Orcinus orca DD
      - Genus: Peponocephala
        - Melon-headed whale, Peponocephala electra DD
    - Family: Ziphidae
      - Genus: Mesoplodon
        - Blainville's beaked whale, Mesoplodon densirostris DD
      - Genus: Ziphius
        - Cuvier's beaked whale, Ziphius cavirostris DD

== Order: Carnivora (carnivorans) ==
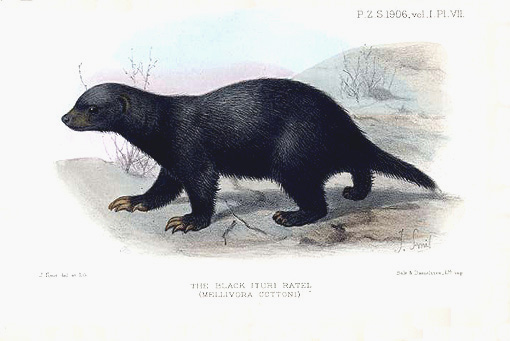
Black ratel (M. c. cottoni), a pure black subspecies of honey badger native to the Congo

There are over 260 species of carnivorans, the majority of which feed primarily on meat. They have a characteristic skull shape and dentition.

- Suborder: Feliformia
  - Family: Felidae
    - Subfamily: Felinae
      - Genus: Caracal
        - African golden cat, C. aurata VU
      - Genus: Leptailurus
        - Serval, Leptailurus serval LC
    - Subfamily: Pantherinae
      - Genus: Panthera
        - Leopard, P. pardus VU
  - Family: Viverridae
    - Subfamily: Viverrinae
      - Genus: Civettictis
        - African civet, C. civetta LC
      - Genus: Genetta
        - Servaline genet, G. servalina LC
        - King genet, G. poensis DD
      - Genus: Poiana
        - Central African oyan, Poiana richardsonii LC
  - Family: Nandiniidae
    - Genus: Nandinia
      - African palm civet, N. binotata LC
  - Family: Herpestidae
    - Genus: Bdeogale
      - Black-footed mongoose, B. nigripes LC
    - Genus: Crossarchus
      - Alexander's kusimanse, C. alexandri LC
    - Genus: Herpestes
      - Common slender mongoose, H. sanguineus LC
    - Genus: Xenogale
      - Long-nosed mongoose, H. naso LC
  - Family: Hyaenidae
    - Genus: Crocuta
      - Spotted hyena, C. crocuta LC
- Suborder: Caniformia
  - Family: Canidae
    - Genus: Lupulella
      - Side-striped jackal, L. adusta LC
  - Family: Mustelidae
    - Genus: Ictonyx
      - Striped polecat, I. striatus LC
    - Genus: Mellivora
      - Honey badger, M. capensis LC
    - Genus: Hydrictis
      - Speckle-throated otter, H. maculicollis NT
    - Genus: Aonyx
      - African clawless otter, A. capensis NT

== Order: Artiodactyla (even-toed ungulates) ==
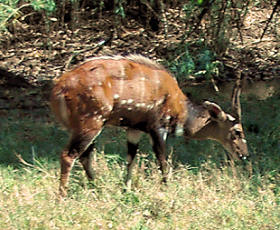
Bushbuck

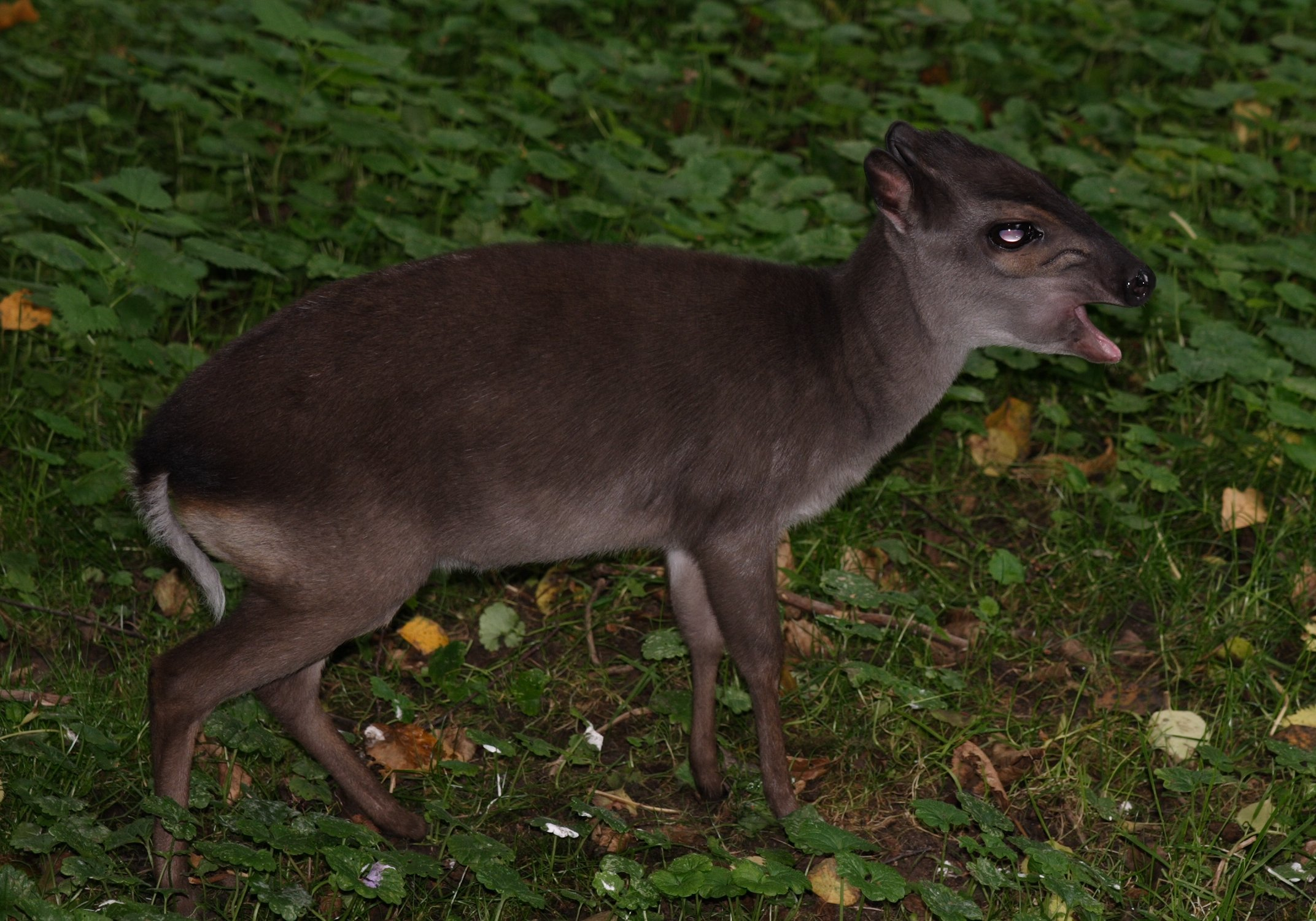
Blue duiker

The even-toed ungulates are ungulates whose weight is borne about equally by the third and fourth toes, rather than mostly or entirely by the third as in perissodactyls. There are about 220 artiodactyl species, including many that are of great economic importance to humans.

- Family: Suidae (pigs)
  - Subfamily: Phacochoerinae
    - Genus: Phacochoerus
      - Common warthog, Phacochoerus africanus
  - Subfamily: Suinae
    - Genus: Hylochoerus
      - Giant forest hog, Hylochoerus meinertzhageni
    - Genus: Potamochoerus
      - Red river hog, Potamochoerus porcus
- Family: Hippopotamidae (hippopotamuses)
  - Genus: Hippopotamus
    - Hippopotamus, H. amphibius VU
- Family: Tragulidae
  - Genus: Hyemoschus
    - Water chevrotain, Hyemoschus aquaticus
- Family: Bovidae (cattle, antelope, sheep, goats)
  - Subfamily: Antilopinae
    - Genus: Neotragus
      - Bates's pygmy antelope, Neotragus batesi
  - Subfamily: Bovinae
    - Genus: Syncerus
      - African buffalo, Syncerus caffer
    - Genus: Tragelaphus
      - Bongo, Tragelaphus eurycerus
      - Bushbuck, Tragelaphus scriptus
      - Sitatunga, Tragelaphus spekii
  - Subfamily: Cephalophinae
    - Genus: Cephalophus
      - Peters's duiker, Cephalophus callipygus LR/nt
      - Bay duiker, Cephalophus dorsalis LR/nt
      - White-bellied duiker, Cephalophus leucogaster LR/nt
      - Blue duiker, Cephalophus monticola LR/lc
      - Black-fronted duiker, Cephalophus nigrifrons LR/nt
      - Ogilby's duiker, Cephalophus ogilbyi LR/nt
      - Yellow-backed duiker, Cephalophus silvicultor LR/nt
    - Genus: Sylvicapra
      - Common duiker, Sylvicapra grimmia LR/lc
  - Subfamily: Reduncinae
    - Genus: Kobus
      - Waterbuck, Kobus ellipsiprymnus LR/cd
    - Genus: Redunca
      - Southern reedbuck, Redunca arundinum LR/cd

== See also ==
- List of chordate orders
- Lists of mammals by region
- List of prehistoric mammals
- Mammal classification
- List of mammals described in the 2000s
- List of birds of the Republic of the Congo
