= Kerbis Peterhans's wood mouse =

Scientific classification
- Kingdom: Animalia
- Phylum: Chordata
- Class: Mammalia
- Order: Rodentia
- Family: Muridae
- Genus: Hylomyscus
- Species: H. kerbispeterhansi

Binomial name
- Hylomyscus kerbispeterhansi Demos, Agwanda & Hickerson, 2014

Species of rodent

The Kerbis Peterhans's wood mouse (Hylomyscus kerbispeterhansi) is a species of rodent in the family Muridae. It is found in western Kenya, and presumably eastern Uganda on Mt. Elgon, and was first described as a new species to science in 2014. Its natural habitat is tropical montane rainforest. It occurs in sympatry with Hylomyscus endorobae in the Mau Forest of Kenya. The specific epithet honours American mammalogist and educator Julian Kerbis Peterhans.
