= Hylomyscus endorobae =

Conservation status
- Least Concern (IUCN 3.1)

Scientific classification
- Domain: Eukaryota
- Kingdom: Animalia
- Phylum: Chordata
- Class: Mammalia
- Order: Rodentia
- Family: Muridae
- Genus: Hylomyscus
- Species: H. endorobae

Binomial name
- Hylomyscus endorobae (Heller, 1910)

Synonyms
- Epimys endorobae Heller, 1910

Species of rodent

Hylomyscus endorobae is a species of rodent of the genus Hylomyscus that is found only in select portions of the wet East African montane forests of the Kenyan Rift mountains of southwestern Kenya and Tanzania, and only at elevations above 2,000 metres (6,600 ft).

It was described in 1910 as Epimys endorobae and initially considered a distinct species. It was later reclassified as a synonym of Hylomyscus denniae, thought to be a widespread species but with a disjunct distribution among the tropical wet forests of a broader afromontane biotic region. It had also been interpreted as a small form of the genus Praomys.

In 2006, Hylomyscus and Praomys were confirmed to be distinct genus-group taxa, and H. endorobae was again recognized as a distinct species. Twelve species of Hylomyscus are currently recognized, provisionally arranged in six groups. H. endorobae together with H. denniae and H. vulcanorum comprise the H. denniae group. These three species are quite similar, and they occupy similar habitats that are in relative close proximity to one another.

However, because they exclusively inhabit wet montane forests above 2,000 m, they are geographically isolated from one another, in much the same way that some species become endemic to particular islands. H. endorobae appears to be endemic to the Kenyan Rift mountains east of Lake Victoria from Mount Elgon to Mount Kenya. H. denniae, on the other hand, is endemic to the Ruwenzori Mountains, along the border between Uganda and the Democratic Republic of the Congo, while H. vulcanorum is found just south of the Equator, in Burundi, Rwanda, and the D.R. Congo.

Eight characteristics distinguish the various members of the genus Hylomyscus. For example, H. endorobae can be distinguished because it is larger than H. denniae, with a broader skull and larger molars.
