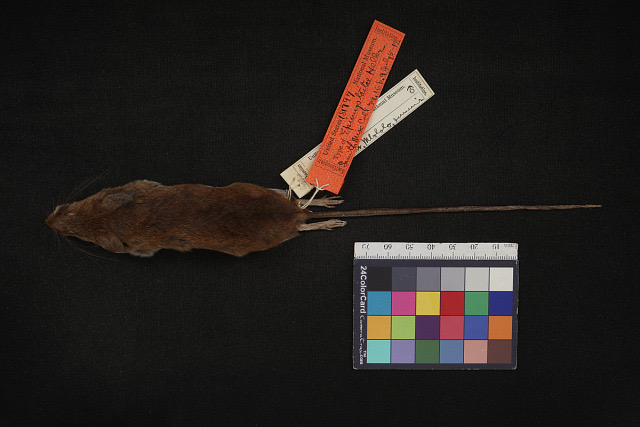

Conservation status
- Least Concern (IUCN 3.1)

Scientific classification
- Kingdom: Animalia
- Phylum: Chordata
- Class: Mammalia
- Infraclass: Placentalia
- Order: Rodentia
- Family: Muridae
- Tribe: Praomyini
- Genus: Montemys; Nicolas et al., 2021
- Species: M. delectorum

Binomial name
- Montemys delectorum (Thomas, 1910)

Synonyms
- Praomys delectorum

= Delectable soft-furred mouse =

Species of rodent

The delectable soft-furred mouse or East African praomys (Montemys delectorum) is a species of rodent in the family Muridae. It is the only member of the genus Montemys; it was formerly classified in the genus Praomys.

It is found in Kenya, Malawi, Mozambique, Tanzania, and Zambia. Its natural habitat is subtropical or tropical moist montane forests. It is threatened by habitat loss.
