= Walter Verheyen's mouse =

Scientific classification
- Kingdom: Animalia
- Phylum: Chordata
- Class: Mammalia
- Order: Rodentia
- Family: Muridae
- Genus: Hylomyscus
- Species: H. walterverheyeni

Binomial name
- Hylomyscus walterverheyeni Nicolas, Wendelen, Barriere, Dudu & Colyn, 2008

Species of rodent

Walter Verheyen's mouse (Hylomyscus walterverheyeni) is a species of rodent of the genus Hylomyscus that is found in the Central African lowland and mountain forests.

== Description ==
The species was first described in 2008 and was named after Walter Verheyen, who was the first to study the genus Hylomyscus.

Hylomyscus walterverheyeni has soft, fine fur which is reddish brown on its back and whitish gray on its underside. Juveniles are blackish gray. The mean head-body length is 86 mm and the mean tail length is 129 mm. It weighs between 11 and 29 g (mean 18 g).

The species morphology is very similar to related species Hylomyscus stella. It can be distinguished by DNA analysis, and cranial and dental morphometrics.

== Distribution ==
The species is found in forests up to 2000 m is the Republic of Congo, Gabon, Central African Republic, and south-east and western Cameroon.

== Diet ==
Their diet consists of insects, fruits, and seeds. The availability of food depends on the location and time of year.
