= Hylomyscus pamfi =

Conservation status
- Data Deficient (IUCN 3.1)

Scientific classification
- Kingdom: Animalia
- Phylum: Chordata
- Class: Mammalia
- Order: Rodentia
- Family: Muridae
- Genus: Hylomyscus
- Species: H. pamfi

Binomial name
- Hylomyscus pamfi Nicolas, Olayemi, Wendelen & Colyn, 2010

Species of rodent

Hylomyscus pamfi is a species of murid rodent in the genus Hylomyscus. It is native to southeastern Ghana, Togo, Benin, and southwestern Nigeria.

Hylomyscus pamfi has been found to be a host of Lassa Virus.
