= Dwarf multimammate mouse =

Conservation status
- Data Deficient (IUCN 3.1)

Scientific classification
- Kingdom: Animalia
- Phylum: Chordata
- Class: Mammalia
- Order: Rodentia
- Family: Muridae
- Tribe: Praomyini
- Genus: Serengetimys; Nicolas et al., 2021
- Species: S. pernanus

Binomial name
- Serengetimys pernanus (Kershaw, 1921)

Species of rodent

The dwarf multimammate mouse (Serengetimys pernanus) is a species of rodent in the family Muridae. It is the only member of the genus Serengetimys; it was formerly classified in the genus Mastomys.

It is found in Kenya, Rwanda, and Tanzania. Its natural habitat is savanna, such as that present in the famous Serengeti National Park, which gave the genus its name.
