= Chingawa forest rat =

Conservation status
- Critically Endangered (IUCN 3.1)

Scientific classification
- Kingdom: Animalia
- Phylum: Chordata
- Class: Mammalia
- Order: Rodentia
- Family: Muridae
- Tribe: Praomyini
- Genus: Chingawaemys; Lavrenchenko, Mikula, & Bryja, 2021
- Species: C. rarus

Binomial name
- Chingawaemys rarus Lavrenchenko, Mikula, & Bryja, 2021

Rodent endemic to Ethiopia

The Chingawa forest rat (Chingawaemys rarus) is a species of rodent endemic to Ethiopia. It is the only member of the monotypic genus Chingawaemys. It was only described in 2021, when it was discovered during a broad phylogenetic analysis of the tribe Praomyini.

It is thought to have diverged from its closest relatives over 6 million years ago, during the Pliocene. The species inhabits the last remnant of tropical rainforest present in Ethiopia, in an area called Chingawa near the border with South Sudan. It is only known from one specimen collected 15 years prior to description, and researchers have been unable to regain access the type locality of the specimen. The genus is at major risk of extinction due to mass deforestation in the area for coffee production.

== See also ==
- List of living mammal species described in the 2020s
