= Angolan wood mouse =

Conservation status
- Least Concern (IUCN 3.1)

Scientific classification
- Domain: Eukaryota
- Kingdom: Animalia
- Phylum: Chordata
- Class: Mammalia
- Order: Rodentia
- Family: Muridae
- Genus: Hylomyscus
- Species: H. carillus

Binomial name
- Hylomyscus carillus (Thomas, 1904)

Species of rodent

The Angolan hylomyscus or Angolan wood mouse (Hylomyscus carillus) is a species of rodent in the family Muridae.

It is found only in Angola.

Its natural habitat is subtropical or tropical dry forest.
