= Mount Oku hylomyscus =

Conservation status
- Endangered (IUCN 3.1)

Scientific classification
- Kingdom: Animalia
- Phylum: Chordata
- Class: Mammalia
- Order: Rodentia
- Family: Muridae
- Genus: Hylomyscus
- Species: H. grandis

Binomial name
- Hylomyscus grandis Eisentraut, 1969

Species of rodent

The Mount Oku hylomyscus (Hylomyscus grandis) is a species of rodent in the family Muridae. Found only on Mount Oku, Cameroon, in tropical Central Africa, its natural habitat is tropical moist montane forests. It has a very small range and is threatened by habitat destruction, so the International Union for Conservation of Nature has rated its conservation status as being "endangered".

== Description ==
The largest wood mouse in the genus Hylomyscus, it grows to a head-and-body length of between 89 and 110 mm (3.5 and 4.3 in) with a tail of between 130 and 150 mm (5.1 and 5.9 in). The fur on the back is about 10 mm (0.4 in) long and is variable in colour, ranging from greyish-brown to cinnamon brown, the individual hairs being grey with either black or brown tips. The underparts are greyish-white, the individual hairs being grey with white tips. There is a sharp delineation between the colour of the upper and underparts. The fore-feet are small with five digits, one without a claw, and sparse white hairs; the hind-feet are also small, have five digits with claws, and bear sparse white hairs. The tail is about 145% of the length of head-and-body and is nearly hairless, with scattered small scales and short dark bristles, longer near the tip of the tail.

== Ecology ==
Very little is known about the ecology and behaviour of the Mount Oku hylomyscus as only four individuals have been collected. It lives in montane forest and the length of its tail makes it likely that it has a climbing life-style. One individual, caught in January, was a pregnant female with five or six embryos.

== Status ==
H. grandis has a very restricted range, only four specimens having been gathered from a single location at 2,100 m (6,900 ft) above sea level on the slopes of Mount Oku in Cameroon. Its total area of occurrence is approximately 470 km^{2} (180 sq mi) and little of the natural forest in which it lives remains, as trees are being felled to make way for agriculture, and to provide timber for construction and firewood. Because of these factors, the International Union for Conservation of Nature has rated its conservation status as being "endangered".
