= Baer's wood mouse =

Conservation status
- Endangered (IUCN 3.1)

Scientific classification
- Kingdom: Animalia
- Phylum: Chordata
- Class: Mammalia
- Order: Rodentia
- Family: Muridae
- Genus: Hylomyscus
- Species: H. baeri

Binomial name
- Hylomyscus baeri Heim de Balsac & Aellen, 1965

Species of rodent

Baer's hylomyscus or Baer's wood mouse (Hylomyscus baeri) is a species of rodent in the family Muridae. It is found in Ivory Coast, Ghana, and Sierra Leone. Its natural habitat is subtropical or tropical moist lowland forests. It is threatened by habitat loss.
