= Arc Mountain wood mouse =

Conservation status
- Least Concern (IUCN 3.1)

Scientific classification
- Kingdom: Animalia
- Phylum: Chordata
- Class: Mammalia
- Order: Rodentia
- Family: Muridae
- Genus: Hylomyscus
- Species: H. arcimontensis

Binomial name
- Hylomyscus arcimontensis Carleton & Stanley, 2005

Species of rodent

The Arc Mountain wood mouse (Hylomyscus arcimontensis) is a species of murid rodent in the genus Hylomyscus. It is native to central Tanzania and northern Malawi.
