= Ansell's wood mouse =

Ansell's wood mouse (Hylomyscus anselli)

Scientific classification
- Domain: Eukaryota
- Kingdom: Animalia
- Phylum: Chordata
- Class: Mammalia
- Order: Rodentia
- Family: Muridae
- Genus: Hylomyscus
- Species: H. anselli

Binomial name
- Hylomyscus anselli Bishop, 1979

Species of rodent

Ansell's wood mouse (Hylomyscus anselli) is a species of rodent in the genus Hylomyscus. It was described in 1979.
