= Long-footed shrew =

Conservation status
- Least Concern (IUCN 3.1)

Scientific classification
- Kingdom: Animalia
- Phylum: Chordata
- Class: Mammalia
- Order: Eulipotyphla
- Family: Soricidae
- Genus: Crocidura
- Species: C. crenata

Binomial name
- Crocidura crenata Brosset, DuBost & Heim de Balsac, 1965
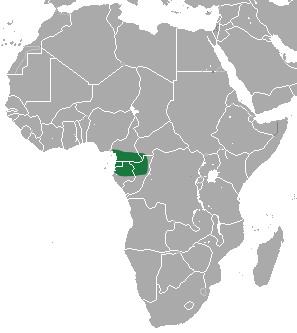
- Long-footed shrew range1

Species of mammal

The long-footed shrew (Crocidura crenata) is a species of mammal in the family Soricidae. It is found in Cameroon, Central African Republic, Republic of the Congo, Democratic Republic of the Congo, Equatorial Guinea, and Gabon. Its natural habitat is subtropical or tropical moist lowland forests.
