= African pygmy squirrel =

Conservation status
- Least Concern (IUCN 3.1)

Scientific classification
- Kingdom: Animalia
- Phylum: Chordata
- Class: Mammalia
- Infraclass: Placentalia
- Order: Rodentia
- Family: Sciuridae
- Tribe: Protoxerini
- Genus: Myosciurus; Thomas, 1909
- Species: M. pumilio

Binomial name
- Myosciurus pumilio (Le Conte, 1857)
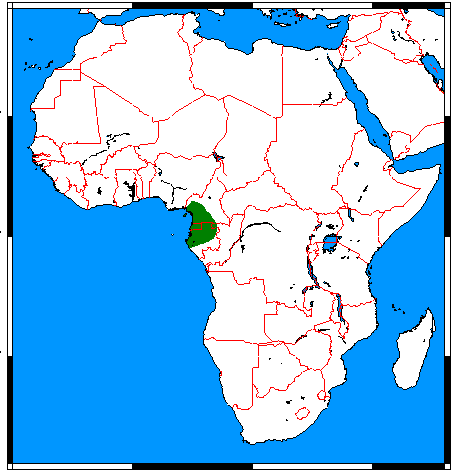
- Range map of the African pygmy squirrel

Species of rodent

The African pygmy squirrel (Myosciurus pumilio) is a species of rodent in the family Sciuridae. It is monotypic within the genus Myosciurus. It is found in tropical rainforests in Cameroon, the Republic of the Congo, Equatorial Guinea, and Gabon. It is not considered threatened, but likely declines locally due to habitat loss. Together with the least pygmy squirrel of Asia, the African pygmy squirrel is the world's smallest squirrel measuring about 12–14 cm (4.7–5.5 in) in total length and just 15–18 g (0.53–0.63 oz) in weight, which is less than a typical house mouse.

== Habitat ==
African pygmy squirrels are diurnal and live in trees. These squirrels are found in many forests in Central Africa. They prefer lower levels of the canopy, and spend most of the time at heights up to five meters.

== Physical description ==
African pygmy squirrels are the smallest squirrel species in the world. These pygmy squirrels have longer hind limbs than forelimbs, an arched profile skull, rooted cheek teeth, and ever growing incisors. The African pygmy squirrel's tiny body is more mouse-like than squirrel-like. The borders of the eyes and ears are rounded with white edges at the tip. The coat is light olive white in the under parts and buffy umber brown in the upper parts. The standard adult mass is 16.5 grams (0.58 oz). This species has one premolar in each side of the upper jaw. There is slight sexual dimorphism between males and females, with female body size moderately smaller than males but male cranial size is slightly smaller than females. The head and body length is about 60–75 mm (2.4–3.0 in) and the tail has a measurement of 50–60 mm (2.0–2.4 in) in length. Other physical features include: endothermy, homeothermy, and bilateral symmetry.

== Reproduction ==
Information regarding the African pygmy squirrel's reproduction has not been fully defined. Generally arboreal squirrels have a polygamous mating system, where there is male-male competition for access to females. Eventually the female mates with the most competitive, and they will mate in a protected area to prevent attacks or threats during copulation. The average number of offspring is about 2. It has been indicated that breeding occurs early during the year. Breeding appears to be concentrated seasonally based on observations of similar squirrel species, but it is not known which season favors breeding. Females provide all the parental care for the offspring, but researchers have not defined the details.

== Behavior ==
African pygmy squirrels live in trees, they are diurnal squirrels that spend time searching for food, due to their small size. They are the only species of squirrels that travel upside down and right-side up along the branches of trees. African pygmy squirrels are solitary, but they have been observed with other individuals. They do not participate in grouping together to attack predators.

== Communication and perception ==
African Pygmy Squirrels have keen hearing, vision, and smell. They use the vibrissae on their bodies to help them in navigation of tree trunks and branches. A low-intensity alarm vocalization has been recorded and it is described as a "faint pipping sound", seeming to alert and call attention to nearby danger. These calls may warn young or nearby animals of a threat.

== Food habits ==
Unlike most squirrels, African pygmy squirrels don't cache food, meaning they don't hide and store their food. Myosciurus pumilio species are omnivorous. These squirrels eat scrapings from bark, insects, and fruit. It is theorized that oily spores from microscopic fungus may be the primary substance these squirrels obtain from the bark. African pygmy squirrels are bark gleaners and forage incessantly.

== Predation ==
African pygmy squirrels are victims to birds of prey. Also some other known predators are civets, snakes, and army ants. These squirrels have a cryptic color and remain aware to protect themselves from predators.

== Conservation status ==
Deforestation and habitat degradation is the main threat to this species, as it reduces where they live due to low population numbers and its specific ecology. In western Central Africa there is poor environmental governance, illegal logging operation, population growth, and weak protection of the area are some of the threats these squirrels are experiencing. Deforestation is the overall dominant threat to the African pygmy squirrel, which reduces their habitat for this squirrel and countless other species. According to the IUCN, Myosciurus pumilio, classified as "vulnerable" from 1994 to 2004, has now been listed as "least concern".
