= African smoky mouse =

Conservation status
- Least Concern (IUCN 3.1)

Scientific classification
- Kingdom: Animalia
- Phylum: Chordata
- Class: Mammalia
- Order: Rodentia
- Family: Muridae
- Subfamily: Murinae
- Tribe: Praomyini
- Genus: Heimyscus; Misonne, 1969
- Species: H. fumosus

Binomial name
- Heimyscus fumosus (Brosset, DuBost & Heim de Balsac, 1965)

Species of rodent

The African smoky mouse or smokey heimyscus (Heimyscus fumosus) is a species of rodent in the family Muridae. It is the only species in the genus Heimyscus.

It is native to Central Africa, where it occurs in Cameroon, Central African Republic, Republic of the Congo, Democratic Republic of the Congo, Equatorial Guinea, and Gabon. It is a habitat specialist, living only in primary lowland forest. It is threatened by deforestation.
