= Hylomyscus vulcanorum =

Scientific classification
- Kingdom: Animalia
- Phylum: Chordata
- Class: Mammalia
- Order: Rodentia
- Family: Muridae
- Genus: Hylomyscus
- Species: H. vulcanorum

Binomial name
- Hylomyscus vulcanorum Lönnberg & Gyldenstolpe, 1925

Species of rodent

Hylomyscus vulcanorum is a species of rodent in the family Muridae.
