= Montane wood mouse =

Conservation status
- Least Concern (IUCN 3.1)

Scientific classification
- Kingdom: Animalia
- Phylum: Chordata
- Class: Mammalia
- Order: Rodentia
- Family: Muridae
- Genus: Hylomyscus
- Species: H. denniae

Binomial name
- Hylomyscus denniae (Thomas, 1906)

Species of rodent

The montane hylomyscus or montane wood mouse (Hylomyscus denniae) is a species of rodent in the family Muridae. A long-coated species with brownish-grey upper parts and whitish-grey underparts, it occurs in the uplands of tropical Central Africa where its natural habitat is tropical moist montane forests.

== Description ==
This species is one of the largest wood mice in the genus, growing to a head-and-body length of about 100 mm (4 in) with a tail of 140 mm (5.5 in). The fur is dense and long, the top of the head and the dorsal surface of the body being dark brownish-grey, each individual hair being grey with a brown tip. The flanks are similar in colour, but with a slight rufous tinge, and the underside of the head and the ventral surface of the body are whitish-grey, each individual hair being grey with a white tip. The whiskers are long and black, the large eyes are surrounded by short black hairs, and there is a rufous patch between the eyes and ears. The upper sides of the legs are white and there are small white tufts of hairs on the digits of the hind feet. The tail is about 140% of the length of head-and-body and is nearly hairless, ringed by small scales and clad in short dark bristles.

== Distribution and habitat ==
The montane wood mouse has a widespread distribution across tropical Central Africa. It is found in a number of separate populations in Angola, Burundi, Democratic Republic of the Congo, Kenya, Rwanda, Tanzania, Uganda, Zambia, and possibly Malawi. It occurs in moist forests, mostly at altitudes between 1,500 and 4,400 m (4,900 and 14,400 ft), but down to about 1,000 m (3,300 ft) in Angola and Zambia. It is restricted to the montane forest zone and does not occur above the tree line in the Afro-montane grassland zone.

== Ecology ==
Its lifestyle is nocturnal and arboreal. A nest is constructed in a hole in a tree, and its long tail and small hind feet seem to be adaptations for climbing among the branches, vines and foliage. The diet consists of mainly green plant material obtained in trees and on the ground, but also of insects, other invertebrates, seeds and fruit.

Breeding takes place during most of the year but most frequently occurs in the dry season and at the start of the wet season, between about July and September. The average litter size is 4.5 offspring, with the largest litters occurring in the dry season. Both females and males become mature when they weigh about 22 g (0.8 oz).

== Status ==
H. denniae has a very wide range, no particular threats have been recognised and the population is thought to be stable; this is a common species of wood mouse in many parts of its range and the International Union for Conservation of Nature has rated its conservation status as being of "least concern".
