= African wading rat =

African wading rat Temporal range: Pleistocene to recent

Conservation status
- Least Concern (IUCN 3.1)

Scientific classification
- Kingdom: Animalia
- Phylum: Chordata
- Class: Mammalia
- Order: Rodentia
- Family: Muridae
- Tribe: Praomyini
- Genus: Colomys; Thomas & Wroughton, 1907
- Species: C. goslingi

Binomial name
- Colomys goslingi Thomas & Wroughton, 1907

Species of rodent

The African wading rat or African water rat (Colomys goslingi) is a species of rodent in the family Muridae. It is native to Africa, where it occurs in Angola, Burundi, Cameroon, Republic of the Congo, Democratic Republic of the Congo, Equatorial Guinea, Gabon, Kenya, Liberia, Rwanda, South Sudan, Uganda, and Zambia.

An aquatic species, this rat is found in and around streams and pools in rainforest habitat, and sometimes in grassland and savanna regions.

In 2020, a team of researchers from Siena College established that it is actually four separate species: the other three species have been named Colomys wologizi, C. lumumbai, and C. eisentrauti.

== Notes ==
- Colomys. Integrated Taxonomic Information System. (ITIS)
- Musser, G. G.; Carleton, M. D. (2005). "Superfamily Muroidea". In Wilson, D. E.; Reeder, D. M. (eds.). Mammal Species of the World: A Taxonomic and Geographic Reference (3rd ed.). Johns Hopkins University Press. pp. 894–1531. ISBN 978-0-8018-8221-0. OCLC 62265494.
