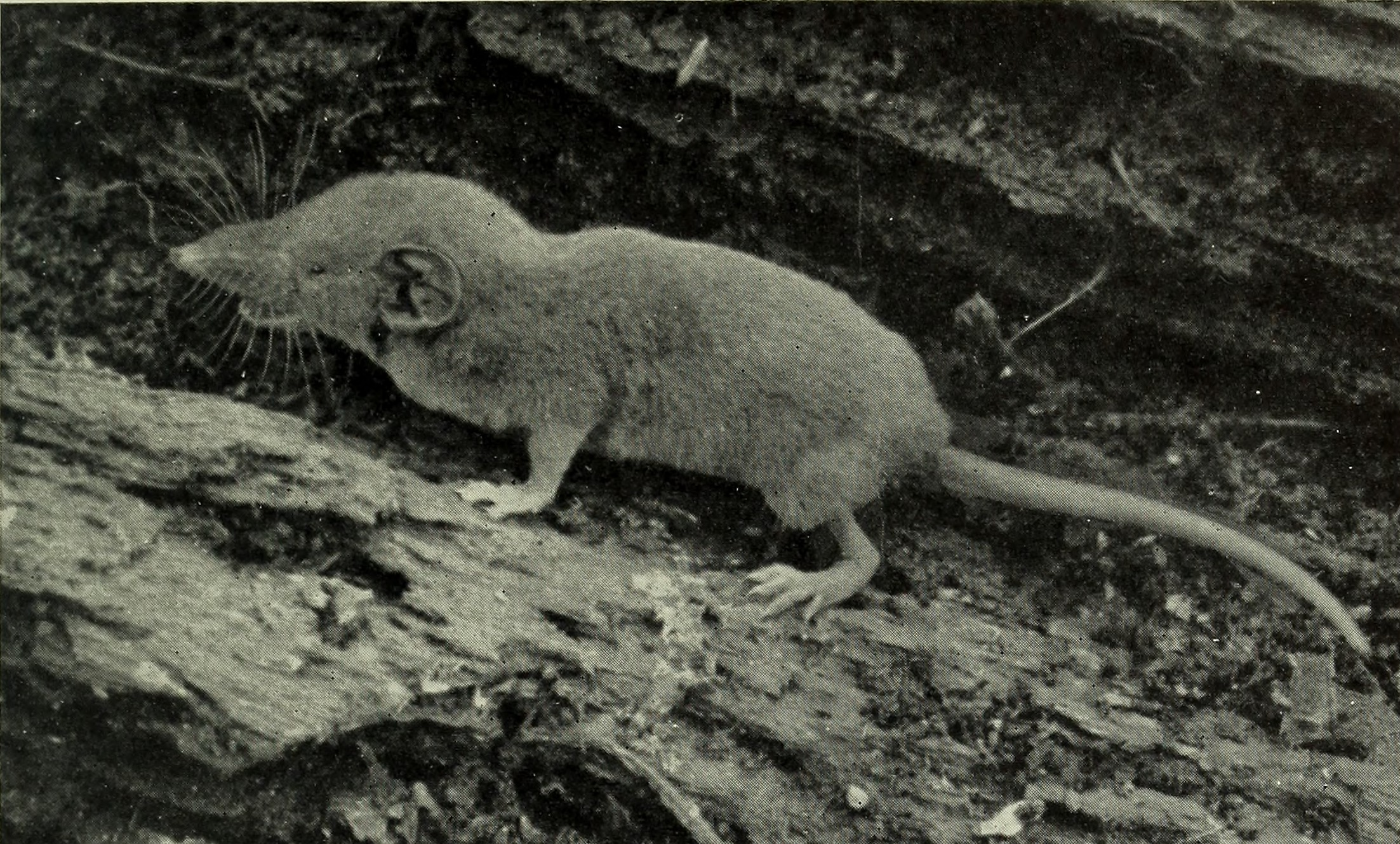

Conservation status
- Least Concern (IUCN 3.1)

Scientific classification
- Kingdom: Animalia
- Phylum: Chordata
- Class: Mammalia
- Order: Eulipotyphla
- Family: Soricidae
- Genus: Crocidura
- Species: C. denti

Binomial name
- Crocidura denti Dollman, 1915
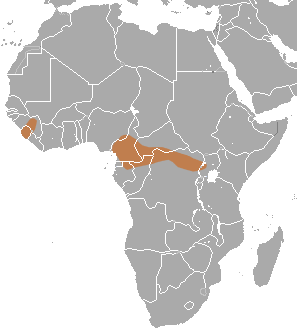
- Dent's shrew range

= Dent's shrew =

Species of mammal

Dent's shrew (Crocidura denti) is a species of mammal in the family Soricidae. It is found in Cameroon, Central African Republic, Republic of the Congo, Democratic Republic of the Congo, Equatorial Guinea, Gabon, Guinea, Liberia, Nigeria, Sierra Leone, and Uganda. Its natural habitats are subtropical or tropical moist lowland forest and moist savanna.
