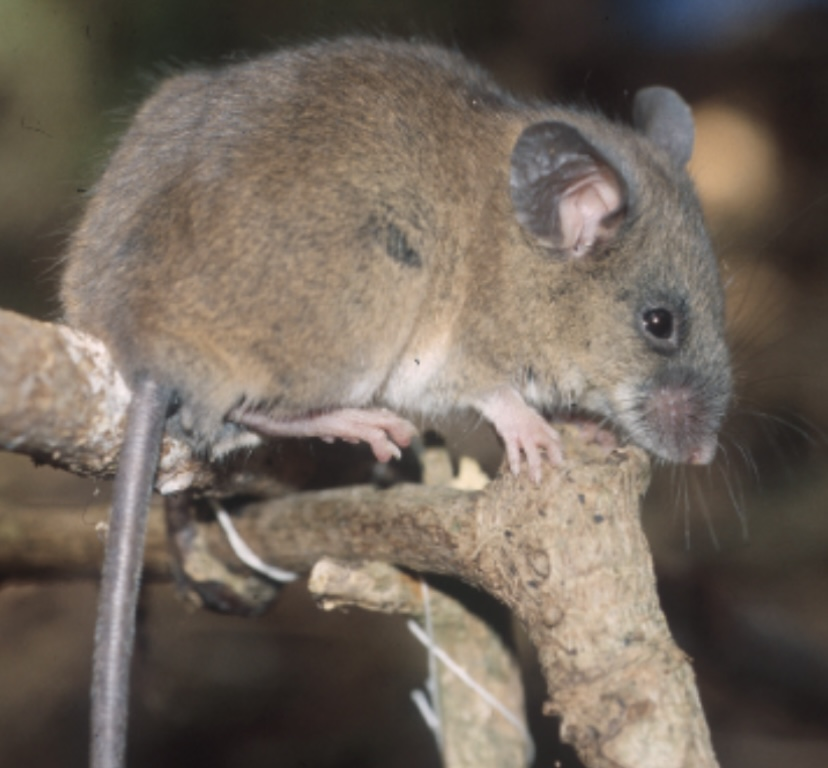
- Hylomyscus stanleyi

Scientific classification
- Kingdom: Animalia
- Phylum: Chordata
- Class: Mammalia
- Order: Rodentia
- Family: Muridae
- Subfamily: Murinae
- Tribe: Praomyini
- Genus: Hylomyscus; Thomas, 1926

Type species
- Epimys aeta Thomas, 1911

21 Species
- Hylomyscus aeta Hylomyscus alleni Hylomyscus anselli Hylomyscus arcimontensis Hylomyscus baeri Hylomyscus carillus Hylomyscus denniae Hylomyscus endorobae Hylomyscus grandis Hylomyscus heinrichorum Hylomyscus kerbispeterhansi Hylomyscus mpungamachagorum Hylomyscus pamfi Hylomyscus parvus Hylomyscus pygmaeus Hylomyscus stanleyi Hylomyscus stella Hylomyscus simus Hylomyscus thornesmithae Hylomyscus vulcanorum Hylomyscus walterverheyeni

= Hylomyscus =

Genus of rodents

Hylomyscus is a genus of rodent in the family Muridae endemic to Africa.

It contains 21 species divided into six species groups:

- H. aeta group
  - Beaded wood mouse, Hylomyscus aeta (Thomas, 1911)
  - Mount Oku wood mouse, Hylomyscus grandis Eisentraut, 1969
- H. alleni group
  - Allen's wood mouse, Hylomyscus alleni (Waterhouse, 1838)
  - Angolan wood mouse, Hylomyscus carillus (Thomas, 1904)
  - Hylomyscus pamfi Nicolas, Olayemi, Wendelen & Colyn, 2010
  - Flat-nosed wood mouse, Hylomyscus simus (Allen & Coolidge, 1930)
  - Stella wood mouse, Hylomyscus stella (Thomas, 1911)
  - Walter Verheyen's mouse, Hylomyscus walterverheyeni Nicolas, Wendelen, Barriere, Dudu & Colyn, 2008
- H. anselli group
  - Ansell's wood mouse, Hylomyscus anselli Bishop, 1979
  - Arc Mountain wood mouse, Hylomyscus arcimontensis Carleton & Stanley, 2005
  - Heinrich's wood mouse, Hylomyscus heinrichorum Carleton, Banasiak & Stanley, 2015
  - Kerbis Peterhans's wood mouse, Hylomyscus kerbispeterhansi Demos, Agwanda & Hickerson, 2014
  - Mahale wood mouse, Hylomyscus mpungamachagorum Demos, Hutterer & Kerbis Peterhans, 2020
  - Pygmy wood mouse, Hylomyscus pygmaeus Kerbis Peterhans, Hutterer & Demos, 2020
  - Stanley’s wood mouse, Hylomyscus stanleyi Kerbis Peterhans, Hutterer & Demos, 2020
  - Mother Ellen’s wood mouse, Hylomyscus thornesmithae (Kerbis Peterhans, Hutterer & Demos, 2020)
- H. baeri group
  - Baer's wood mouse, Hylomyscus baeri Heim de Balsac & Aellen, 1965
- H. denniae group
  - Montane wood mouse, Hylomyscus denniae (Thomas, 1906)
  - Small-footed forest mouse, Hylomyscus endorobae (Heller, 1910)
  - Volcano wood mouse, Hylomyscus vulcanorum (Lönnberg & Gyldenstolpe, 1925)
- H. parvus group
  - Little wood mouse, Hylomyscus parvus Brosset, Dubost & Heim de Balsac, 1965
