= Long-tailed musk shrew =

Conservation status
- Least Concern (IUCN 3.1)

Scientific classification
- Kingdom: Animalia
- Phylum: Chordata
- Class: Mammalia
- Order: Eulipotyphla
- Family: Soricidae
- Genus: Crocidura
- Species: C. dolichura

Binomial name
- Crocidura dolichura Peters, 1876
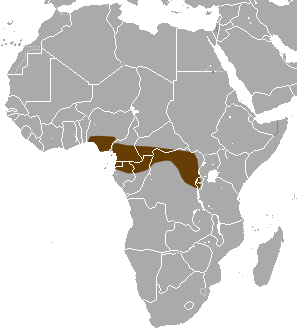
- Long-tailed musk shrew range

Species of mammal

The long-tailed musk shrew (Crocidura dolichura) is a species of shrew in the family Soricidae.

It can be found in Burundi, Cameroon, Central African Republic, Republic of the Congo, Democratic Republic of the Congo, Gabon, Nigeria, and northern Uganda.
