= Grasse's shrew =

Conservation status
- Least Concern (IUCN 3.1)

Scientific classification
- Kingdom: Animalia
- Phylum: Chordata
- Class: Mammalia
- Order: Eulipotyphla
- Family: Soricidae
- Genus: Crocidura
- Species: C. grassei

Binomial name
- Crocidura grassei Brosset, DuBost & Heim de Balsac, 1965
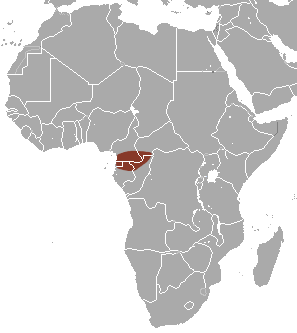
- Grasse's shrew range

Species of mammal

The Grasse's shrew (Crocidura grassei) is a species of mammal in the family Soricidae. It is found in Cameroon, Central African Republic, Republic of the Congo, Gabon, and Equatorial Guinea. Its natural habitat is subtropical or tropical moist lowland forests.
