= Little wood mouse =

Conservation status
- Least Concern (IUCN 3.1)

Scientific classification
- Kingdom: Animalia
- Phylum: Chordata
- Class: Mammalia
- Order: Rodentia
- Family: Muridae
- Genus: Hylomyscus
- Species: H. parvus

Binomial name
- Hylomyscus parvus Brosset, DuBost & Heim de Balsac, 1965

Species of rodent

The lesser hylomyscus or little wood mouse (Hylomyscus parvus) is a species of rodent in the family Muridae. It is found in Cameroon, Central African Republic, Republic of the Congo, Democratic Republic of the Congo, Gabon, and possibly Equatorial Guinea. Its natural habitat is subtropical or tropical moist lowland forests.
