= Allen's wood mouse =

Conservation status
- Least Concern (IUCN 3.1)

Scientific classification
- Kingdom: Animalia
- Phylum: Chordata
- Class: Mammalia
- Order: Rodentia
- Family: Muridae
- Genus: Hylomyscus
- Species: H. alleni

Binomial name
- Hylomyscus alleni (Waterhouse, 1838)

Species of rodent

Allen's wood mouse or Allen's hylomyscus (Hylomyscus alleni) is a species of rodent in the family Muridae. It is native to West and Central Africa, where it is widely distributed. It occurs in deciduous forest habitat.
