= Beaded wood mouse =

Conservation status
- Least Concern (IUCN 3.1)

Scientific classification
- Kingdom: Animalia
- Phylum: Chordata
- Class: Mammalia
- Order: Rodentia
- Family: Muridae
- Genus: Hylomyscus
- Species: H. aeta

Binomial name
- Hylomyscus aeta (Thomas, 1911)

Synonyms
- Epimys aeta Thomas, 1911

Species of rodent

The beaded hylomyscus or beaded wood mouse (Hylomyscus aeta) is a species of rodent in the family Muridae. It is found in Burundi, Cameroon, Central African Republic, Republic of the Congo, Democratic Republic of the Congo, Equatorial Guinea, Gabon, and Uganda. Its natural habitats are subtropical or tropical moist lowland forest and subtropical or tropical moist montane forest.
