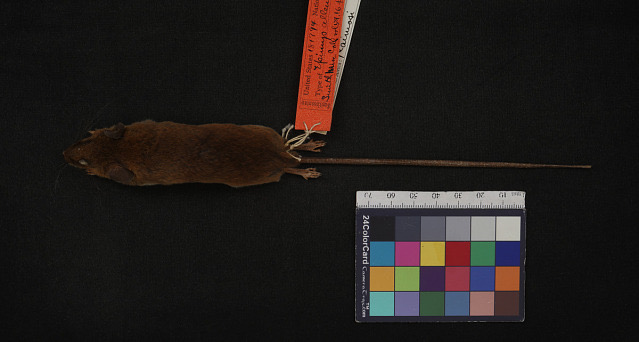

Conservation status
- Least Concern (IUCN 3.1)

Scientific classification
- Kingdom: Animalia
- Phylum: Chordata
- Class: Mammalia
- Infraclass: Placentalia
- Order: Rodentia
- Family: Muridae
- Genus: Hylomyscus
- Species: H. stella

Binomial name
- Hylomyscus stella (Thomas, 1911)

Synonyms
- Epimys stella Thomas, 1911

= Stella wood mouse =

Species of rodent

The Stella hylomyscus or Stella wood mouse (Hylomyscus stella) is a species of rodent in the family Muridae. It is found in Burundi, Cameroon, Central African Republic, Republic of the Congo, Democratic Republic of the Congo, Equatorial Guinea, Gabon, Kenya, Nigeria, Rwanda, South Sudan, Tanzania, and Uganda. Its natural habitats are subtropical or tropical moist lowland forest and subtropical or tropical moist montane forest.
