= List of mammals of Burkina Faso =

This is a list of the mammal species recorded in Burkina Faso. There are 147 mammal species in Burkina Faso, of which two are endangered, seven are vulnerable, and three are near threatened. One of the species listed for Burkina Faso can no longer be found in the wild.

The following tags are used to highlight each species' conservation status as assessed by the International Union for Conservation of Nature:

EX	Extinct	No reasonable doubt that the last individual has died.
EW	Extinct in the wild	Known only to survive in captivity or as a naturalized populations well outside its previous range.
CR	Critically endangered	The species is in imminent risk of extinction in the wild.
EN	Endangered	The species is facing an extremely high risk of extinction in the wild.
VU	Vulnerable	The species is facing a high risk of extinction in the wild.
NT	Near threatened	The species does not meet any of the criteria that would categorise it as risking extinction but it is likely to do so in the future.
LC	Least concern	There are no current identifiable risks to the species.
DD	Data deficient	There is inadequate information to make an assessment of the risks to this species.

Some species were assessed using an earlier set of criteria. Species assessed using this system have the following instead of near threatened and least concern categories:

LR/cd	Lower risk/conservation dependent	Species which were the focus of conservation programmes and may have moved into a higher risk category if that programme was discontinued.
LR/nt	Lower risk/near threatened	Species which are close to being classified as vulnerable but are not the subject of conservation programmes.
LR/lc	Lower risk/least concern	Species for which there are no identifiable risks.

== Order: Tubulidentata (aardvarks) ==
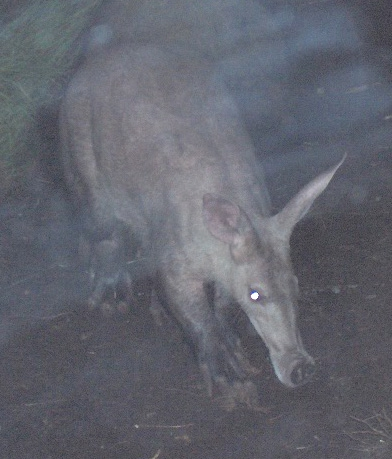
Aardvark

The order Tubulidentata consists of a single species, the aardvark. Tubulidentata are characterised by their teeth which lack a pulp cavity and form thin tubes which are continuously worn down and replaced.

- Family: Orycteropodidae
  - Genus: Orycteropus
    - Aardvark, O. afer LC

== Order: Proboscidea (elephants) ==
The elephants comprise three living species and are the largest living land animals.

- Family: Elephantidae (elephants)
  - Genus: Loxodonta
    - African forest elephant, L. cyclotis CR

== Order: Primates ==
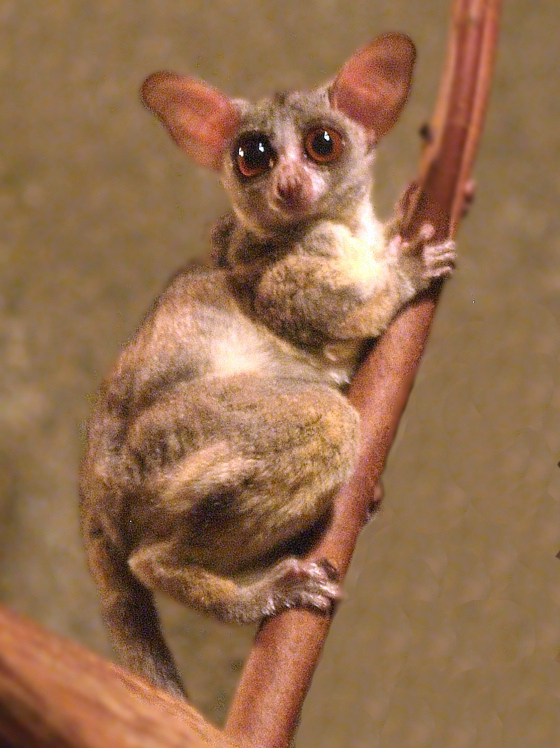
Senegal bushbaby

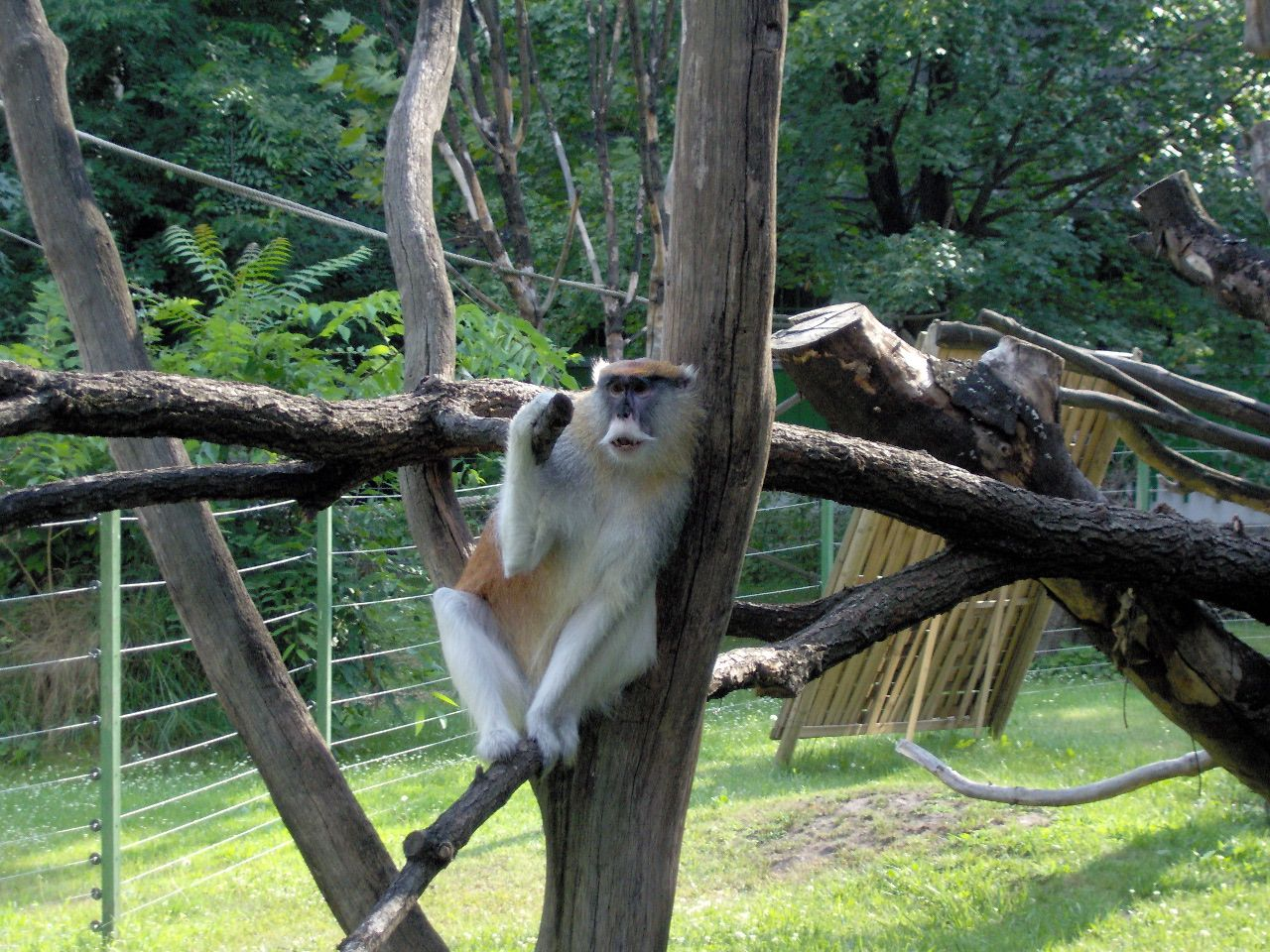
Patas monkey

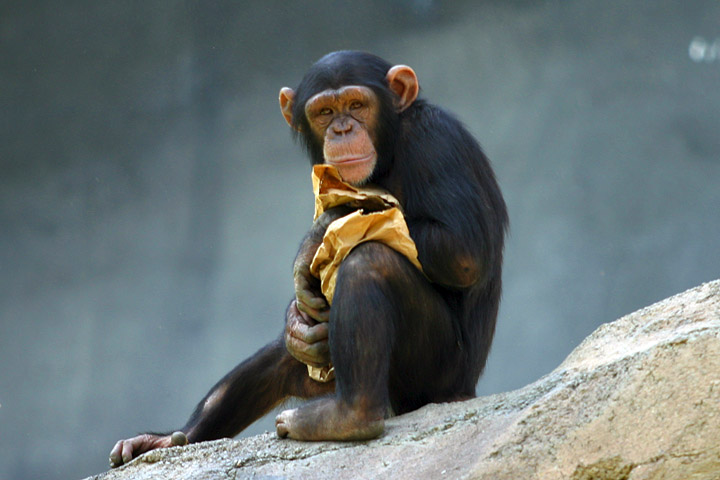
Common chimpanzee

The order Primates contains humans and their closest relatives: lemurs, lorisoids, tarsiers, monkeys, and apes.

- Suborder: Strepsirrhini
  - Infraorder: Lemuriformes
    - Superfamily: Lorisoidea
      - Family: Galagidae
        - Genus: Galagoides
          - Prince Demidoff's bushbaby, Galagoides demidovii LR/lc
        - Genus: Galago
          - Senegal bushbaby, Galago senegalensis LR/lc
- Suborder: Haplorhini
  - Infraorder: Simiiformes
    - Parvorder: Catarrhini
      - Superfamily: Cercopithecoidea
        - Family: Cercopithecidae (Old World monkeys)
          - Genus: Erythrocebus
            - Patas monkey, Erythrocebus patas LR/lc
          - Genus: Chlorocebus
            - Green monkey, Chlorocebus sabaeus LR/lc
            - Tantalus monkey, Chlorocebus tantalus LR/lc
          - Genus: Papio
            - Olive baboon, Papio anubis LR/lc
      - Superfamily: Hominoidea
        - Family: Hominidae (great apes)
          - Subfamily: Homininae
            - Tribe: Panini
              - Genus: Pan
                - Common chimpanzee, Pan troglodytes LC extirpated

== Order: Rodentia (rodents) ==
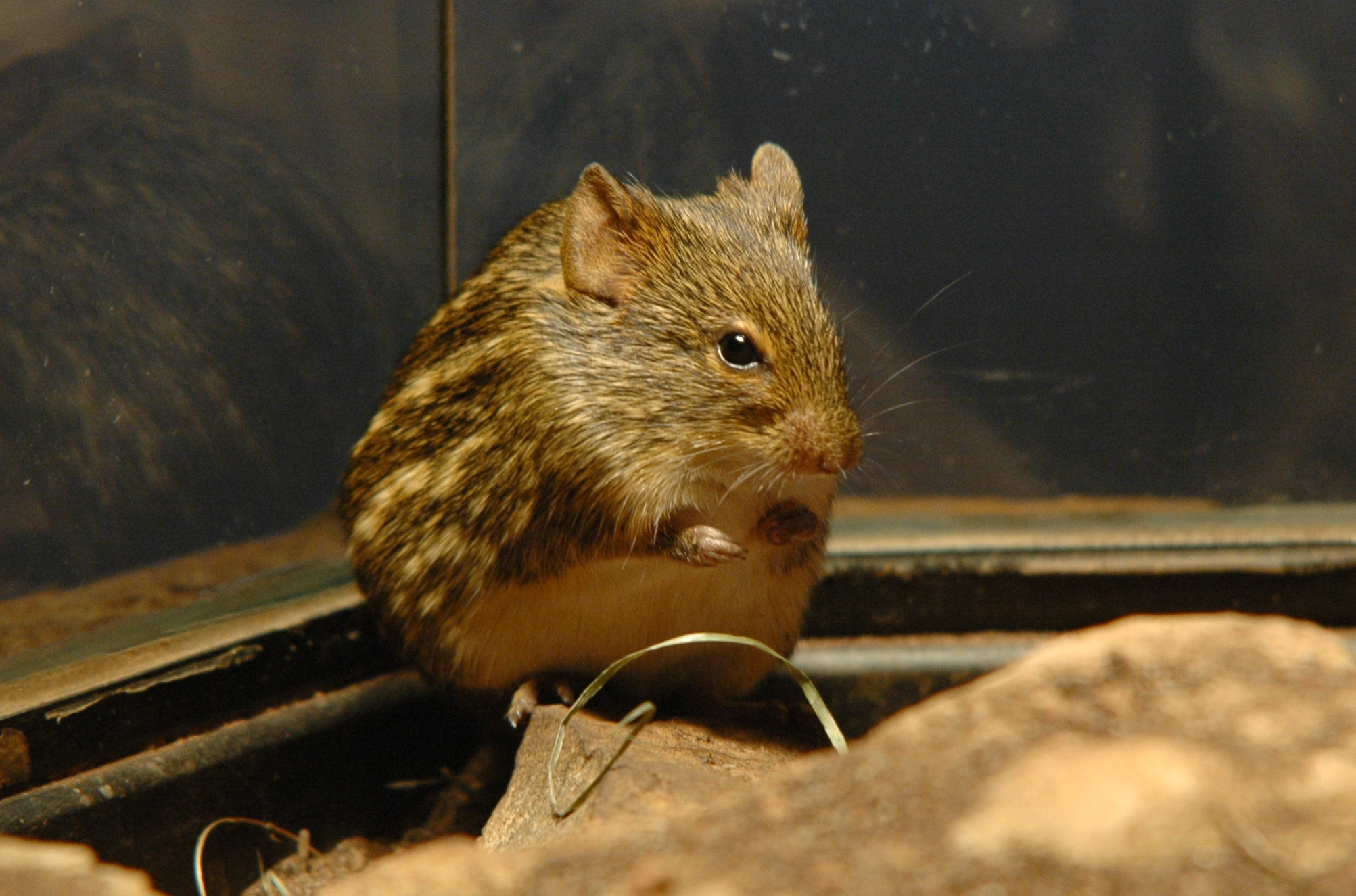
Typical striped grass mouse

Rodents make up the largest order of mammals, with over 40% of mammalian species. They have two incisors in the upper and lower jaw which grow continually and must be kept short by gnawing. Most rodents are small though the capybara can weigh up to 45 kg (100 lb).

- Suborder: Hystricomorpha
  - Family: Hystricidae (Old World porcupines)
    - Genus: Hystrix
      - Crested porcupine, H. cristata LC
- Suborder: Sciurognathi
  - Family: Sciuridae (squirrels)
    - Subfamily: Xerinae
      - Tribe: Xerini
        - Genus: Xerus
          - Striped ground squirrel, Xerus erythropus LC
      - Tribe: Protoxerini
        - Genus: Funisciurus
          - Kintampo rope squirrel, Funisciurus substriatus DD
        - Genus: Heliosciurus
          - Gambian sun squirrel, Heliosciurus gambianus LC
  - Family: Gliridae (dormice)
    - Subfamily: Graphiurinae
      - Genus: Graphiurus
        - Kellen's dormouse, Graphiurus kelleni LC
  - Family: Dipodidae (jerboas)
    - Subfamily: Dipodinae
      - Genus: Jaculus
        - Lesser Egyptian jerboa, Jaculus jaculus LC
  - Family: Nesomyidae
    - Subfamily: Dendromurinae
      - Genus: Steatomys
        - Northwestern fat mouse, Steatomys caurinus LC
        - Dainty fat mouse, Steatomys cuppedius LC
    - Subfamily: Cricetomyinae
      - Genus: Cricetomys
        - Gambian pouched rat, Cricetomys gambianus LC
  - Family: Muridae (mice, rats, voles, gerbils, hamsters, etc.)
    - Subfamily: Deomyinae
      - Genus: Acomys
        - Johan's spiny mouse, Acomys johannis LC
    - Subfamily: Gerbillinae
      - Genus: Desmodilliscus
        - Pouched gerbil, Desmodilliscus braueri LC
      - Genus: Gerbillus
        - Pygmy gerbil, Gerbillus henleyi LC
        - Sudan gerbil, Gerbillus nancillus DD
      - Nigerian gerbil, Gerbillus nigeriae LC
        - Genus: Tatera
          - Guinean gerbil, Tatera guineae LC
          - Kemp's gerbil, Tatera kempi LC
      - Genus: Taterillus
        - Gracile tateril, Taterillus gracilis LC
        - Petter's gerbil, Taterillus petteri LC
    - Subfamily: Murinae
      - Genus: Arvicanthis
        - Sudanian grass rat, Arvicanthis ansorgei LC
        - African grass rat, Arvicanthis niloticus LC
      - Genus: Lemniscomys
        - Bellier's striped grass mouse, Lemniscomys bellieri LC
        - Typical striped grass mouse, Lemniscomys striatus LC
        - Heuglin's striped grass mouse, Lemniscomys zebra LC
      - Genus: Mastomys
        - Guinea multimammate mouse, Mastomys erythroleucus LC
        - Hubert's multimammate mouse, Mastomys huberti LC
        - Natal multimammate mouse, Mastomys natalensis LC
      - Genus: Mus
        - Hausa mouse, Mus haussa LC
        - Matthey's mouse, Mus mattheyi LC
        - African pygmy mouse, Mus minutoides LC
      - Genus: Praomys
        - Dalton's mouse, Praomys daltoni LC
        - Tullberg's soft-furred mouse, Praomys tullbergi LC

== Order: Lagomorpha (lagomorphs) ==
The lagomorphs comprise two families, Leporidae (hares and rabbits), and Ochotonidae (pikas). Though they can resemble rodents, and were classified as a superfamily in that order until the early 20th century, they have since been considered a separate order. They differ from rodents in a number of physical characteristics, such as having four incisors in the upper jaw rather than two.

- Family: Leporidae (rabbits, hares)
  - Genus: Lepus
    - Cape hare, Lepus capensis LR/lc
    - African savanna hare, Lepus microtis LR/lc

== Order: Erinaceomorpha (hedgehogs and gymnures) ==
The order Erinaceomorpha contains a single family, Erinaceidae, which comprise the hedgehogs and gymnures. The hedgehogs are easily recognised by their spines while gymnures look more like large rats.

- Family: Erinaceidae (hedgehogs)
  - Subfamily: Erinaceinae
    - Genus: Atelerix
      - Four-toed hedgehog, Atelerix albiventris LR/lc

== Order: Soricomorpha (shrews, moles, and solenodons) ==
The "shrew-forms" are insectivorous mammals. The shrews and solenodons closely resemble mice while the moles are stout-bodied burrowers.

- Family: Soricidae (shrews)
  - Subfamily: Crocidurinae
    - Genus: Crocidura
      - Cinderella shrew, Crocidura cinderella LC
      - Fox's shrew, Crocidura foxi LC
      - Savanna shrew, Crocidura fulvastra LC
      - Bicolored musk shrew, Crocidura fuscomurina LC
      - Lamotte's shrew, Crocidura lamottei LC
      - Mauritanian shrew, Crocidura lusitania LC
      - Nigerian shrew, Crocidura nigeriae LC
      - Savanna path shrew, Crocidura viaria LC
      - Voi shrew, Crocidura voi LC

== Order: Chiroptera (bats) ==
The bats' most distinguishing feature is that their forelimbs are developed as wings, making them the only mammals capable of flight. Bat species account for about 20% of all mammals.

- Family: Pteropodidae (flying foxes, Old World fruit bats)
  - Subfamily: Pteropodinae
    - Genus: Eidolon
      - Straw-coloured fruit bat, Eidolon helvum LC
    - Genus: Epomophorus
      - Gambian epauletted fruit bat, Epomophorus gambianus LC
    - Genus: Hypsignathus
      - Hammer-headed bat, Hypsignathus monstrosus LC
    - Genus: Lissonycteris
      - Smith's fruit bat, Lissonycteris smithi LC
    - Genus: Micropteropus
      - Peters's dwarf epauletted fruit bat, Micropteropus pusillus LC
- Family: Vespertilionidae
  - Subfamily: Vespertilioninae
    - Genus: Neoromicia
      - Tiny serotine, Neoromicia guineensis LC
      - Banana pipistrelle, Neoromicia nanus LC
      - Rendall's serotine, Neoromicia rendalli LC
      - Somali serotine, Neoromicia somalicus LC
    - Genus: Nycticeinops
      - Schlieffen's bat, Nycticeinops schlieffeni LC
    - Genus: Pipistrellus
      - Egyptian pipistrelle, Pipistrellus deserti LC
      - Tiny pipistrelle, Pipistrellus nanulus LC
      - Rusty pipistrelle, Pipistrellus rusticus LC
    - Genus: Scotophilus
      - African yellow bat, Scotophilus dinganii LC
      - White-bellied yellow bat, Scotophilus leucogaster LC
      - Greenish yellow bat, Scotophilus viridis LC
- Family: Rhinopomatidae
  - Genus: Rhinopoma
    - Egyptian mouse-tailed bat, R. cystops LC
    - Lesser mouse-tailed bat, Rhinopoma hardwickei LC
    - Greater mouse-tailed bat, Rhinopoma microphyllum LC
- Family: Molossidae
  - Genus: Chaerephon
    - Gland-tailed free-tailed bat, Chaerephon bemmeleni LC
    - Lappet-eared free-tailed bat, Chaerephon major LC
    - Little free-tailed bat, Chaerephon pumila LC
  - Genus: Mops
    - Angolan free-tailed bat, Mops condylurus LC
    - Mongalla free-tailed bat, Mops demonstrator NT
    - Midas free-tailed bat, Mops midas LC
- Family: Emballonuridae
  - Genus: Taphozous
    - Naked-rumped tomb bat, Taphozous nudiventris LC
    - Egyptian tomb bat, Taphozous perforatus LC
- Family: Nycteridae
  - Genus: Nycteris
    - Gambian slit-faced bat, Nycteris gambiensis LC
    - Hairy slit-faced bat, Nycteris hispida LC
    - Large-eared slit-faced bat, Nycteris macrotis LC
    - Egyptian slit-faced bat, Nycteris thebaica LC
- Family: Megadermatidae
  - Genus: Lavia
    - Yellow-winged bat, Lavia frons LC
- Family: Rhinolophidae
  - Subfamily: Rhinolophinae
    - Genus: Rhinolophus
      - Rüppell's horseshoe bat, Rhinolophus fumigatus LC
      - Lander's horseshoe bat, Rhinolophus landeri LC
  - Subfamily: Hipposiderinae
    - Genus: Asellia
      - Trident leaf-nosed bat, Asellia tridens LC
    - Genus: Hipposideros
      - Aba roundleaf bat, Hipposideros abae NT
      - Sundevall's roundleaf bat, Hipposideros caffer LC
      - Giant roundleaf bat, Hipposideros gigas LC
      - Jones's roundleaf bat, Hipposideros jonesi NT
      - Noack's roundleaf bat, Hipposideros ruber LC

== Order: Pholidota (pangolins) ==
The order Pholidota comprises the eight species of pangolin. Pangolins are anteaters and have the powerful claws, elongated snout and long tongue seen in the other unrelated anteater species.

- Family: Manidae
  - Genus: Manis
    - Giant pangolin, Manis gigantea LR/lc
    - Long-tailed pangolin, Manis tetradactyla LR/lc
    - Tree pangolin, Manis tricuspis LR/lc

== Order: Carnivora (carnivorans) ==
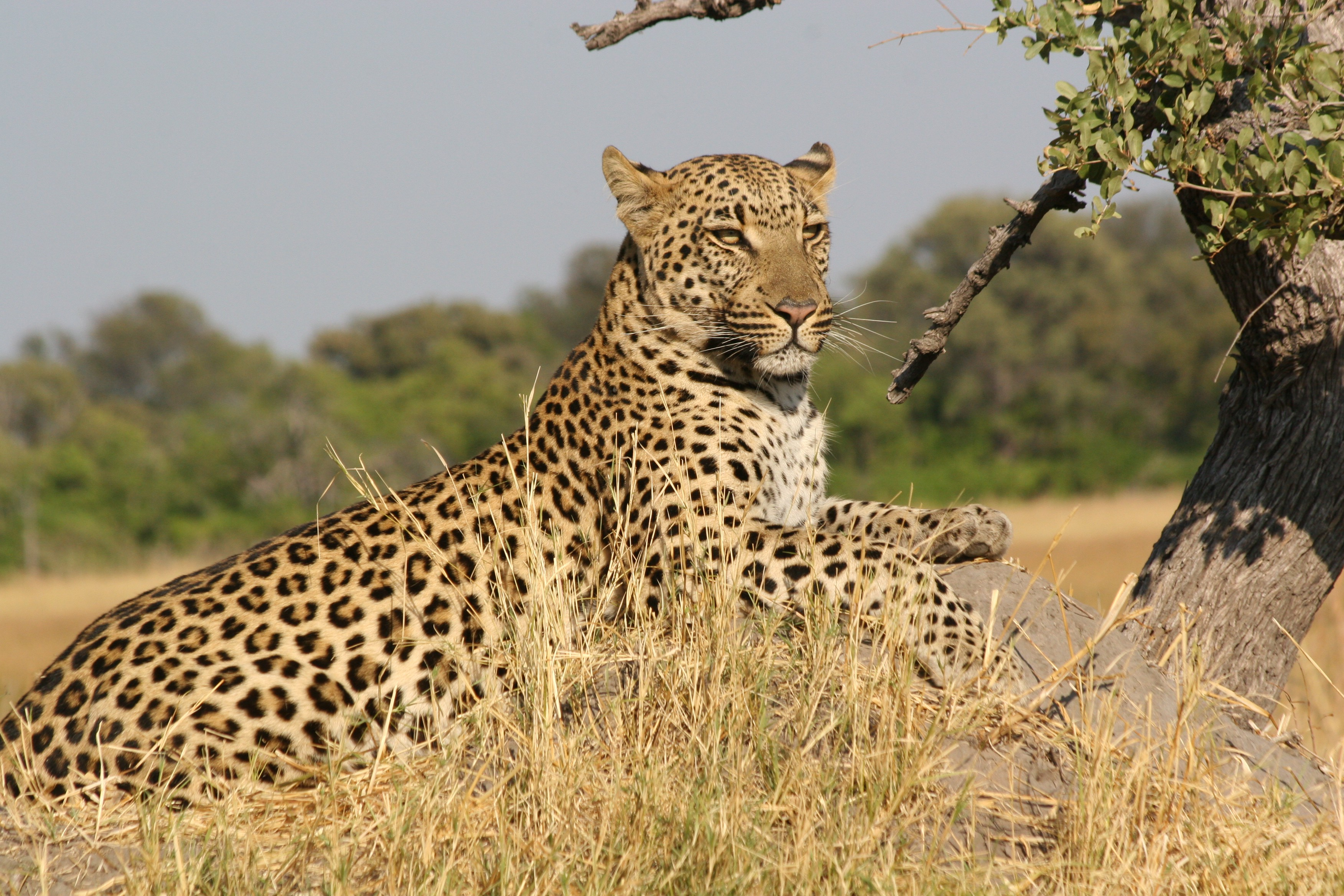
African leopard

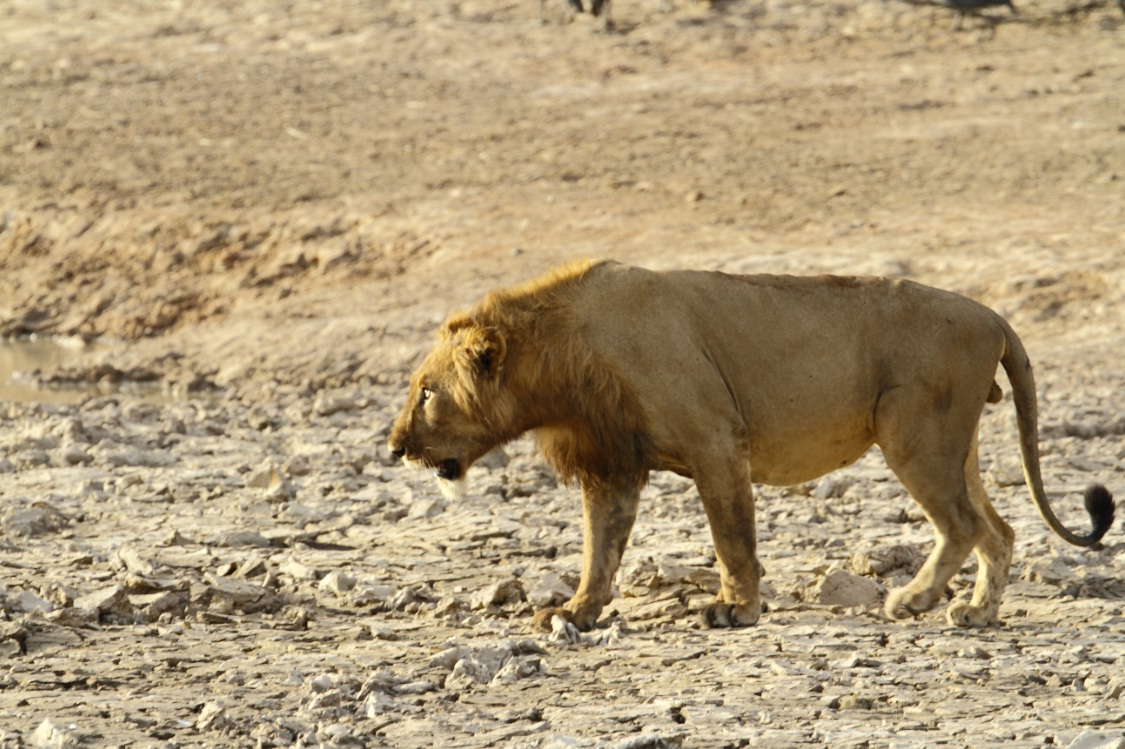
Lion

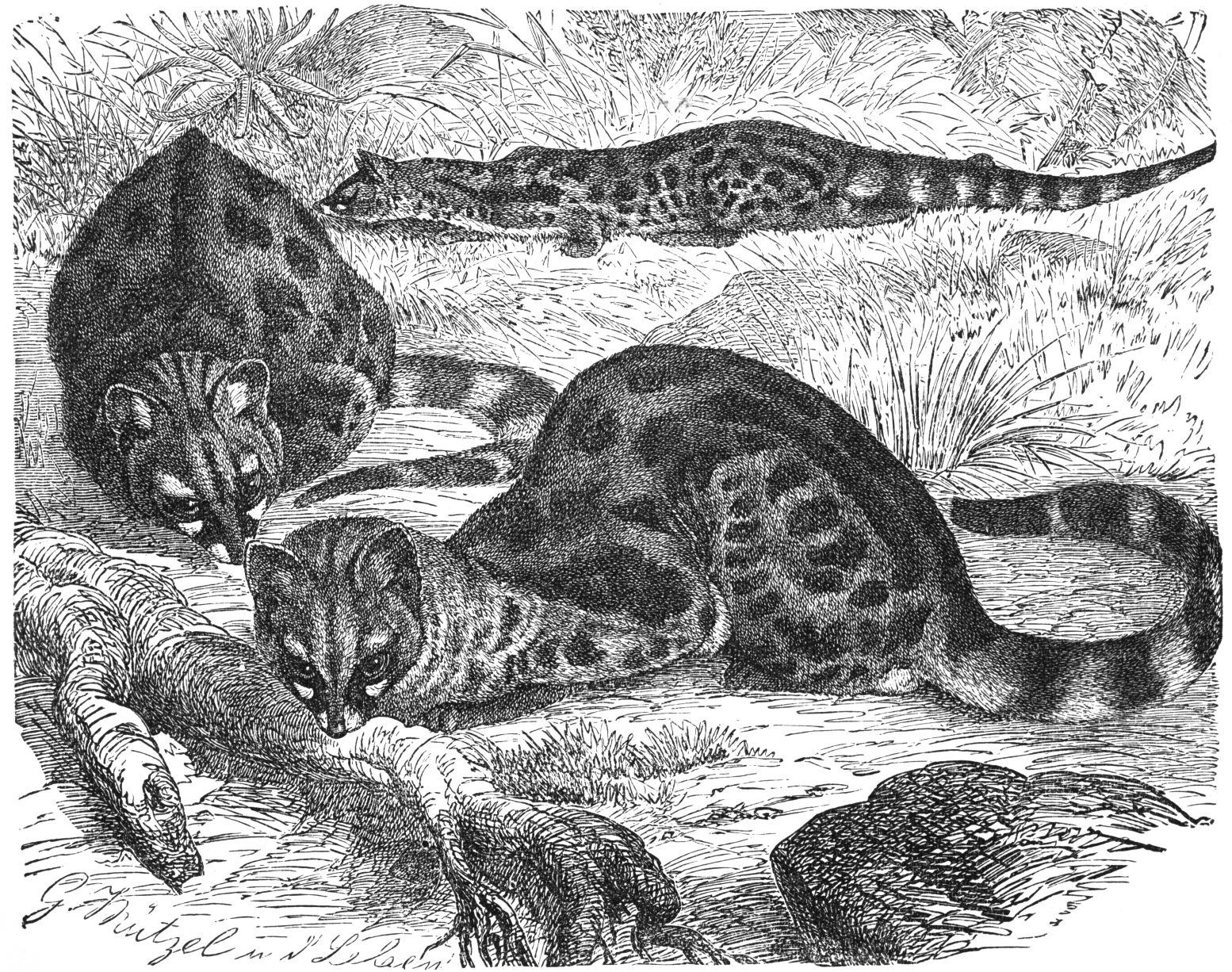
Common genet

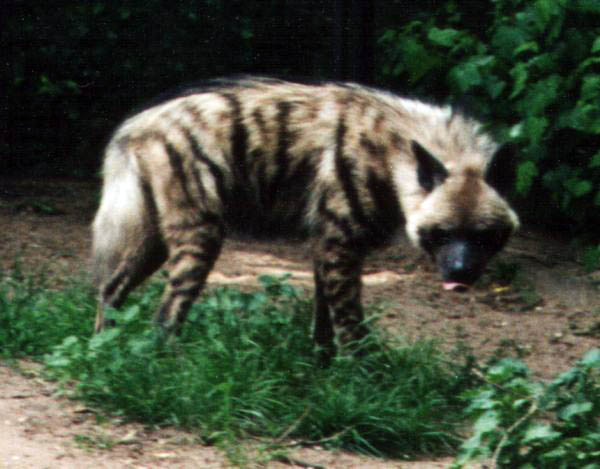
Striped hyena

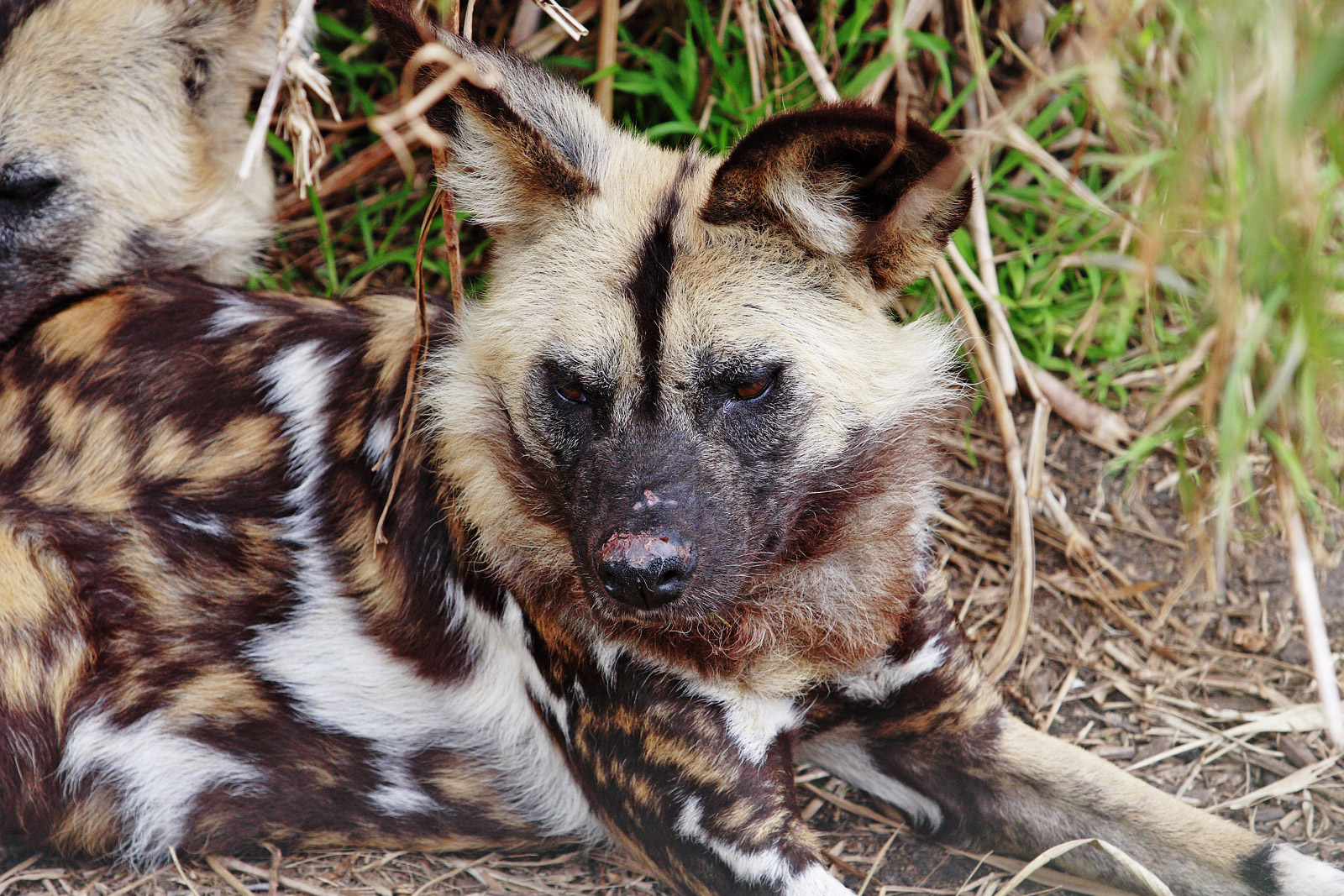
African wild dog

There are over 260 species of carnivorans, the majority of which eat meat as their primary dietary item. They have a characteristic skull shape and dentition.

- Suborder: Feliformia
  - Family: Felidae (cats)
    - Subfamily: Felinae
      - Genus: Acinonyx
        - Cheetah, A. jubatus
          - Northwest African cheetah, A. j. hecki CR
      - Genus: Caracal
        - Caracal, C. caracal LC
      - Genus: Felis
        - African wildcat, F. lybica LC
      - Genus: Leptailurus
        - Serval, L. serval LC
    - Subfamily: Pantherinae
      - Genus: Panthera
        - Lion, Panthera leo VU
        - Leopard, Panthera pardus NT
  - Family: Viverridae
    - Subfamily: Viverrinae
      - Genus: Genetta
        - Common genet, Genetta genetta LC
        - Rusty-spotted genet, Genetta maculata LC
        - Hausa genet, Genetta thierryi LC
  - Family: Herpestidae (mongooses)
    - Genus: Herpestes
      - Common slender mongoose, Herpestes sanguineus LC
    - Genus: Ichneumia
      - White-tailed mongoose, Ichneumia albicauda LC
  - Family: Hyaenidae (hyaenas)
    - Genus: Crocuta
      - Spotted hyena, Crocuta crocuta LC
    - Genus: Hyaena
      - Striped hyena, Hyaena hyaena NT
- Suborder: Caniformia
  - Family: Canidae (dogs, foxes)
    - Genus: Vulpes
      - Pale fox, Vulpes pallida LC
    - Genus: Canis
      - African golden wolf, Canis lupaster LC
    - Genus: Lupulella
      - Side-striped jackal, L. adusta LC
    - Genus: Lycaon
      - African wild dog, Lycaon pictus EN
  - Family: Mustelidae (mustelids)
    - Genus: Ictonyx
      - Striped polecat, Ictonyx striatus LC
    - Genus: Mellivora
      - Honey badger, Mellivora capensis LC
    - Genus: Hydrictis
      - Speckle-throated otter, Hydrictis maculicollis LC
    - Genus: Aonyx
      - African clawless otter, Aonyx capensis LC

== Order: Artiodactyla (even-toed ungulates) ==
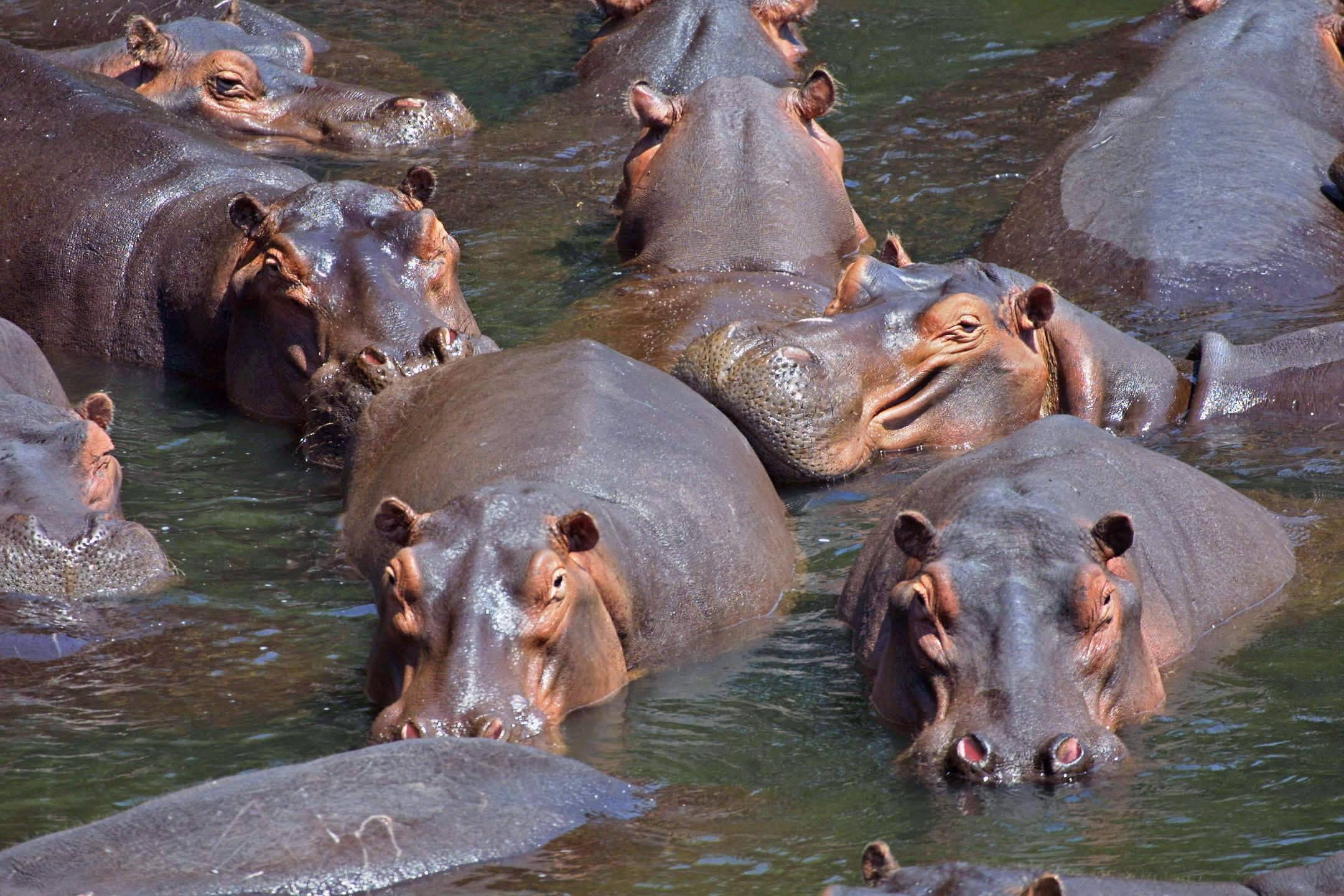
Hippopotamus

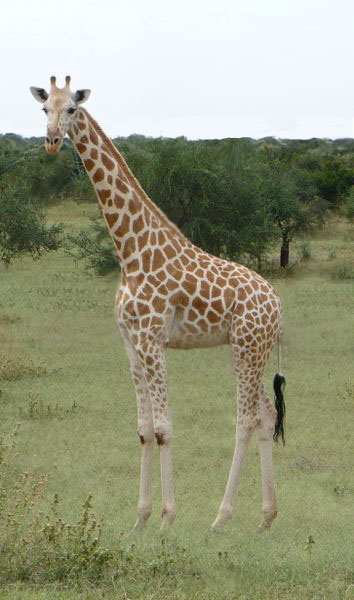
Northern giraffe

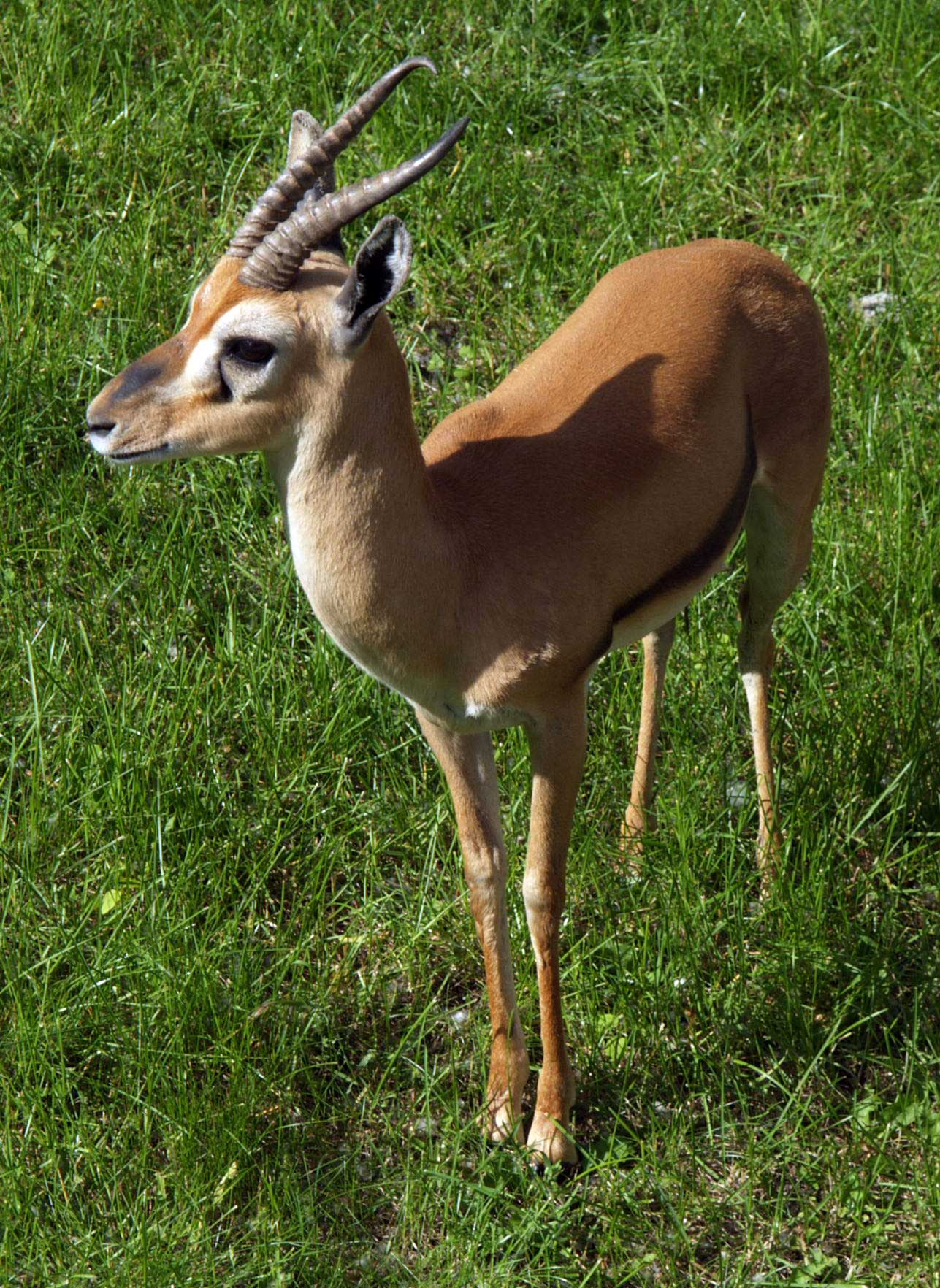
Red-fronted gazelle

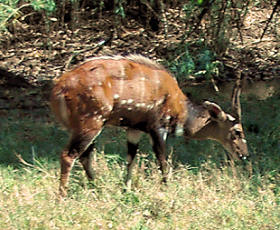
Bushbuck

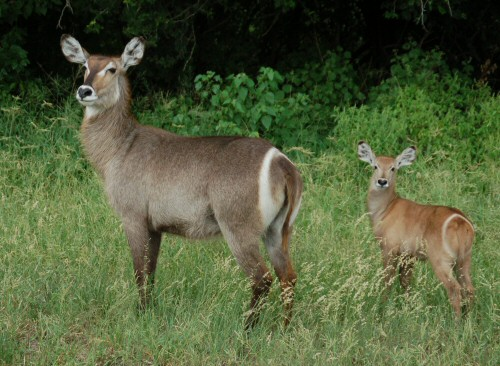
Waterbuck

The even-toed ungulates are ungulates whose weight is borne about equally by the third and fourth toes, rather than mostly or entirely by the third as in perissodactyls. There are about 220 artiodactyl species, including many that are of great economic importance to humans.

- Family: Suidae (pigs)
  - Subfamily: Phacochoerinae
    - Genus: Phacochoerus
      - Common warthog, Phacochoerus africanus LR/lc
- Family: Hippopotamidae (hippopotamuses)
  - Genus: Hippopotamus
    - Hippopotamus, Hippopotamus amphibius VU
- Family: Tragulidae
  - Genus: Hyemoschus
    - Water chevrotain, Hyemoschus aquaticus DD
- Family: Giraffidae (giraffe, okapi)
  - Genus: Giraffa
    - Giraffe, Giraffa camelopardalis VU extirpated, vagrant
- Family: Bovidae (cattle, antelope, sheep, goats)
  - Subfamily: Alcelaphinae
    - Genus: Alcelaphus
      - Hartebeest, Alcelaphus buselaphus LR/cd
    - Genus: Damaliscus
      - Topi, Damaliscus lunatus LR/cd
  - Subfamily: Antilopinae
    - Genus: Gazella
      - Dorcas gazelle, Gazella dorcas VU presence uncertain
      - Red-fronted gazelle, Gazella rufifrons VU
    - Genus: Nanger
      - Dama gazelle, Nanger dama CR extirpated, vagrant
    - Genus: Ourebia
      - Oribi, Ourebia ourebi LR/cd
  - Subfamily: Bovinae
    - Genus: Syncerus
      - African buffalo, Syncerus caffer LR/cd
    - Genus: Tragelaphus
      - Bongo, Tragelaphus eurycerus LR/nt
      - Bushbuck, Tragelaphus scriptus LR/lc
  - Subfamily: Cephalophinae
    - Genus: Cephalophus
      - Bay duiker, Cephalophus dorsalis LR/nt
      - Maxwell's duiker, Cephalophus maxwellii LR/nt
      - Red-flanked duiker, Cephalophus rufilatus LR/cd
      - Yellow-backed duiker, Cephalophus silvicultor LR/nt
    - Genus: Sylvicapra
      - Common duiker, Sylvicapra grimmia LR/lc
  - Subfamily: Hippotraginae
    - Genus: Hippotragus
      - Roan antelope, Hippotragus equinus LR/cd
    - Genus: Oryx
      - Scimitar oryx, Oryx dammah EW
  - Subfamily: Reduncinae
    - Genus: Kobus
      - Waterbuck, Kobus ellipsiprymnus LR/cd
      - Kob, Kobus kob LR/cd
    - Genus: Redunca
      - Bohor reedbuck, Redunca redunca LR/cd

== See also ==
- List of chordate orders
- Lists of mammals by region
- Mammal classification
- List of mammals described in the 2000s
