= Senegal one-striped grass mouse =

Conservation status
- Least Concern (IUCN 3.1)

Scientific classification
- Kingdom: Animalia
- Phylum: Chordata
- Class: Mammalia
- Order: Rodentia
- Family: Muridae
- Genus: Lemniscomys
- Species: L. linulus

Binomial name
- Lemniscomys linulus (Thomas, 1910)

Species of rodent

Lemniscomys linulus, commonly known as the Senegal grass mouse or Senegal one-striped grass mouse, is a species of rodent in the family Muridae. It is found in Ivory Coast, Guinea, Mali, and Senegal and its natural habitat is dry savanna. At one time considered to be a subspecies of Lemniscomys griselda, it is now accepted as a species in its own right.

== Description ==
The Senegal one-striped grass mouse has a head-and-body length of about 110 mm (4.33 in) and a tail of a similar length. The dorsal fur is a buffy-grey colour, with a yellowish tinge on the hindquarters. A clearly defined dark stripe runs along the spine, and there are some indistinct lateral stripes, composed of tiny pale spots; these markings are formed because some of the hairs have pale-coloured tips, and in some individuals they are barely visible. The underparts are white, with a buff-coloured line separating the dorsal and ventral colorations. The tail is dark above, ochre at the sides and buff underneath. The feet are clad in buff-coloured hairs. Similar species with which it might be confused are Lemniscomys striatus and Lemniscomys zebra, but both of these have distinct pale-coloured lateral stripes.

== Distribution and habitat ==
The Senegal one-striped grass mouse is endemic to West Africa where it occurs to the west of the Dahomey Gap, in Mali, Ivory Coast, Guinea and Senegal. It is found typically on dry savanna, but also occurs on wooded savanna, bushy countryside, grassland and cultivated land.

== Status ==
This grass mouse has a limited range in West Africa and it is said to be common in Ivory Coast. No particular threats have been identified, and the International Union for Conservation of Nature has assessed its conservation status as being of least concern.
