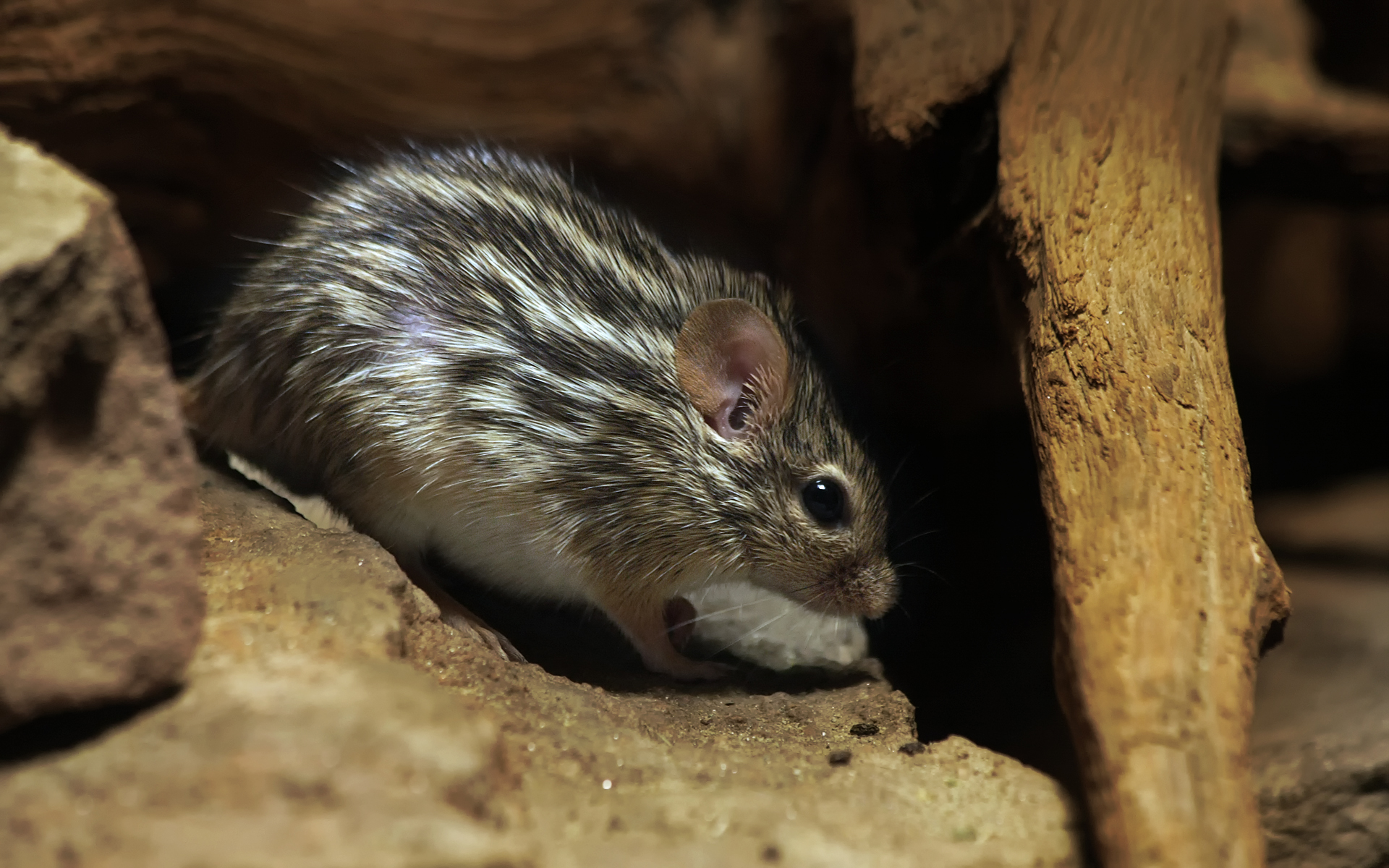

Conservation status
- Least Concern (IUCN 3.1)

Scientific classification
- Kingdom: Animalia
- Phylum: Chordata
- Class: Mammalia
- Infraclass: Placentalia
- Order: Rodentia
- Family: Muridae
- Genus: Lemniscomys
- Species: L. barbarus

Binomial name
- Lemniscomys barbarus (Linnaeus, 1766)

= Barbary striped grass mouse =

Species of rodent

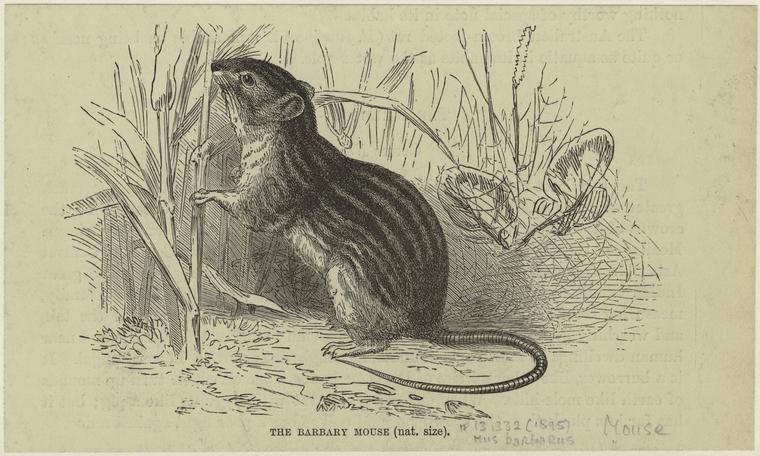
The Barbary mouse, in an 1895 illustration

The Barbary striped grass mouse (Lemniscomys barbarus) is a small rodent of the suborder Myomorpha. This monotypic species is native to coastal Morocco, Algeria and Tunisia in northwest Africa. In the past it was believed to also occur throughout a large part of Sub-Saharan Africa, but these populations are now treated as a separate species, the Heuglin's striped grass mouse (L. zebra). These relatively small Lemniscomys are among the species most commonly kept in captivity.

The Barbary, Heuglin's and Hoogstral's striped grass mouse (L. hoogstraali) form a group that have a distinctly dark and light striped pelage. Other Lemniscomys either have more spotty/interrupted stripes or only a single dark stripe along the back.
