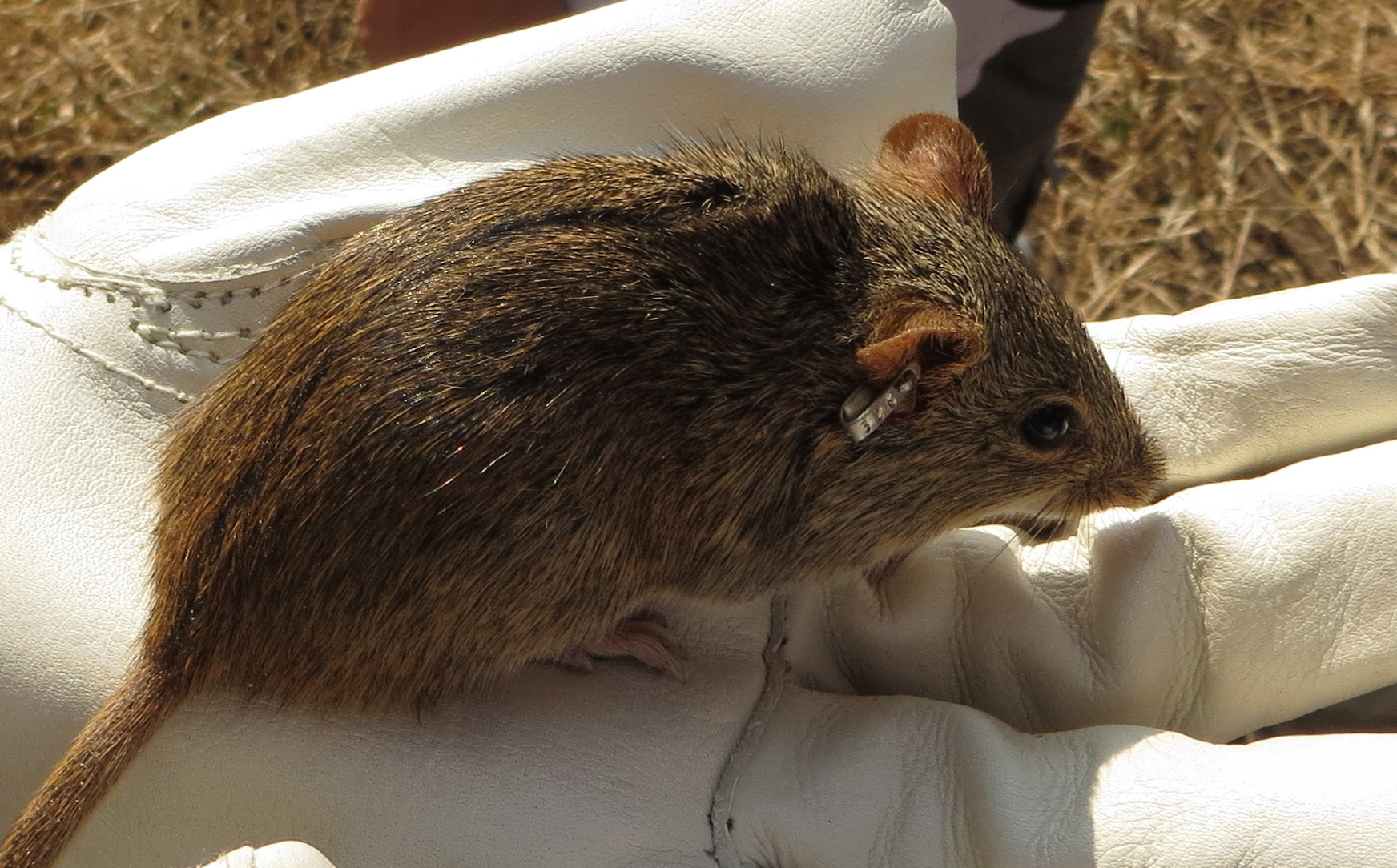
- Tagged single-striped grass mouse (L. rosalia) in Mbuluzi Game Reserve, Swaziland.

Conservation status
- Least Concern (IUCN 3.1)

Scientific classification
- Kingdom: Animalia
- Phylum: Chordata
- Class: Mammalia
- Order: Rodentia
- Family: Muridae
- Genus: Lemniscomys
- Species: L. rosalia

Binomial name
- Lemniscomys rosalia (Thomas, 1904)

= Single-striped grass mouse =

Species of rodent

The single-striped grass mouse or single-striped lemniscomys (Lemniscomys rosalia) is a species of rodent in the family Muridae. It is found in Angola, Botswana, Kenya, Malawi, Mozambique, Namibia, South Africa, Eswatini, Tanzania, Zambia, and Zimbabwe. Its natural habitats are moist savanna and arable land. Total length is 27 cm and its mass is 60g. Diet consists of seeds, greenery, and occasionally insects. It resides in self-constructed burrows and it excavates tunnels that lead to its feeding-grounds. Reproductive season is between September and March and on average litters contain 5 pups, but they can get as large as 11.
