= Buffoon striped grass mouse =

Conservation status
- Least Concern (IUCN 3.1)

Scientific classification
- Kingdom: Animalia
- Phylum: Chordata
- Class: Mammalia
- Order: Rodentia
- Family: Muridae
- Genus: Lemniscomys
- Species: L. macculus

Binomial name
- Lemniscomys macculus (Thomas & Wroughton, 1910)

Species of rodent

The Buffoon lemniscomys or Buffoon striped grass mouse (Lemniscomys macculus) is a species of rodent in the family Muridae. It is found in the Democratic Republic of the Congo, Ethiopia, Kenya, South Sudan, Uganda, and possibly Rwanda. Its natural habitats are moist savannah and subtropical or tropical seasonally wet or flooded lowland grassland.
