= Mittendorf's striped grass mouse =

Conservation status
- Least Concern (IUCN 3.1)

Scientific classification
- Kingdom: Animalia
- Phylum: Chordata
- Class: Mammalia
- Order: Rodentia
- Family: Muridae
- Genus: Lemniscomys
- Species: L. mittendorfi

Binomial name
- Lemniscomys mittendorfi Eisentraut, 1968

Species of rodent

Mittendorf's lemniscomys or Mittendorf's striped grass mouse (Lemniscomys mittendorfi) is a species of rodent in the family Muridae. It is endemic to Cameroon where it is found at high elevations on a single mountain. Its natural habitat is tropical high-altitude grassland. It faces no particular threats and the International Union for Conservation of Nature has listed it as being of "least concern".

== Description ==
Mittendorf's striped grass mouse is a small species growing to a head-and-body length of about 92 mm (3.6 in). The dorsal fur is dark brown, with a narrow blackish stripe along the spine, and eight pale lateral stripes, the upper three of which are composed of separate pale spots but in the lower stripes, these run together to form a continuous line. The flanks are greyish, the chest yellowish-brown and the underparts pale grey, the individual hairs having grey bases and white tips. The snout region and the eyerings are buff, as are the sparsely-haired feet. The tail is nearly as long as the body-length and is bicoloured, black above and pale below, well-clad with hairs in its central section. The chromosome number is 2N = 56.

== Distribution and habitat ==
This grass mouse is known only from Mount Oku in Cameroon, where it is found in the montane grassland above the forest belt, at an altitude of around 2,200 m (7,200 ft). The habitat is grass savanna with scattered bushes. Attempts to find the mouse on nearby mountains in Nigeria with similar habitats were unsuccessful.

== Status ==
This grass mouse has a small range. It may be affected in its upland pasture home by the grazing of livestock and possibly by climate change, but no major threats have been identified, so the International Union for Conservation of Nature has assessed its conservation status as being of "least concern".
