= Griselda's striped grass mouse =

Conservation status
- Least Concern (IUCN 3.1)

Scientific classification
- Kingdom: Animalia
- Phylum: Chordata
- Class: Mammalia
- Order: Rodentia
- Family: Muridae
- Genus: Lemniscomys
- Species: L. griselda

Binomial name
- Lemniscomys griselda (Thomas, 1904)

Species of rodent

Griselda's lemniscomys or Griselda's striped grass mouse (Lemniscomys griselda) is a species of rodent in the family Muridae.

It is found in Angola, Democratic Republic of the Congo, and Zambia.

Its natural habitat is dry savanna.
