= Hoogstraal's striped grass mouse =

Conservation status
- Data Deficient (IUCN 3.1)

Scientific classification
- Kingdom: Animalia
- Phylum: Chordata
- Class: Mammalia
- Order: Rodentia
- Family: Muridae
- Genus: Lemniscomys
- Species: L. hoogstraali

Binomial name
- Lemniscomys hoogstraali Dieterlen, 1991

Species of rodent

Hoogstraal's lemniscomys or Hoogstraal's striped grass mouse (Lemniscomys hoogstraali) is a species of rodent in the family Muridae. It is known only from the type specimen collected in 1961 at Paloich, north of Niayok, South Sudan.

Its descriptive common name is based on its striped markings and its natural habitat in moist savanna. The specific epithet honors entomologist and parasitologist Dr. Harry Hoogstraal.
