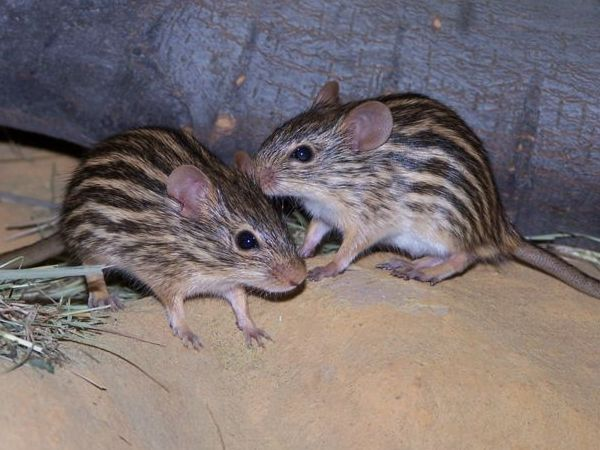
- Barbary striped grass mouse (Lemniscomys barbarus)

Scientific classification
- Kingdom: Animalia
- Phylum: Chordata
- Class: Mammalia
- Order: Rodentia
- Family: Muridae
- Tribe: Arvicanthini
- Genus: Lemniscomys; Trouessart, 1881

Type species
- Mus barbarus Linnaeus, 1766

Species
- See text

= Striped grass mouse =

Striped grass mouse Temporal range: Late Pliocene to Recent

Genus of rodents

Lemniscomys, sometimes known as striped grass mice or zebra mice, is a genus of murine rodents from Africa. Most species are from Sub-Saharan Africa; L. barbarus is the only one found north of the Sahara. They are generally found in grassy habitats, but where several species overlap in distribution there is a level of habitat differentiation between them.

They are 18.5–29 cm (7.3–11.4 in) long, of which about half is tail, and weigh 18–70 g (0.63–2.47 oz). The pelage pattern of the species fall into three main groups: The "true" zebra mice with distinct dark and pale stripes (L. barbarus, L. hoogstraali and L. zebra), the spotted grass mice with more spotty/interrupted stripes (L. bellieri, L. macculus, L. mittendorfi and L. striatus), and the single-striped grass mice with only a single dark stripe along the back (L. griselda, L. linulus, L. rosalia and L. roseveari).

They are generally considered diurnal, but at least some species can be active during the night. They feed on plants, but sometimes take insects. There are up to 12 young per litter, but 4–5 is more common. The life expectancy is very short, in the wild often only a year, but a captive L. striatus lived for almost 5 years. A more typical captive life expectancy is 2–2½ years.

While most are common and not threatened, L. mittendorfi is restricted to Mount Oku and was considered Vulnerable by the IUCN, though it is currently Least Concern. L. hoogstraali and L. roseveari are both very poorly known, leading to their rating as Data Deficient. Some of the widespread species are regularly kept in captivity, especially L. barbarus, L. striatus and L. zebra.

== Etymology ==
The etymology of the genus name Lemniscomys derives from the two ancient greek words λημνίσκος (lēmnískos), meaning "stripe, ribbon", and μῦς (mûs), meaning "mouse, rat", and refers to the pelage pattern.

== Species ==
Lemniscomys currently includes 11 species. Until 1997, L. zebra was generally treated as a subspecies of L. barbarus. It is possible L. striatus and L. zebra, as presently defined, actually are species complexes.

- Lemniscomys barbarus (Linnaeus, 1766) — Barbary striped grass mouse
- Lemniscomys bellieri Van der Straeten, 1975 — Bellier's striped grass mouse
- Lemniscomys griselda (Thomas, 1904) — Griselda's striped grass mouse
- Lemniscomys hoogstraali Dieterlen, 1991 — Hoogstraal's striped grass mouse
- Lemniscomys linulus (Thomas, 1910) — Senegal one-striped grass mouse
- Lemniscomys macculus (Thomas and Wroughton, 1910) — Buffoon striped grass mouse
- Lemniscomys mittendorfi Eisentraut, 1968 — Mittendorf's striped grass mouse
- Lemniscomys rosalia (Thomas, 1904) — single-striped grass mouse
- Lemniscomys roseveari Van der Straeten, 1980 — Rosevear's striped grass mouse
- Lemniscomys striatus (Linnaeus, 1758) — typical striped grass mouse
- Lemniscomys zebra (Heuglin, 1864) — Heuglin's striped grass mouse
