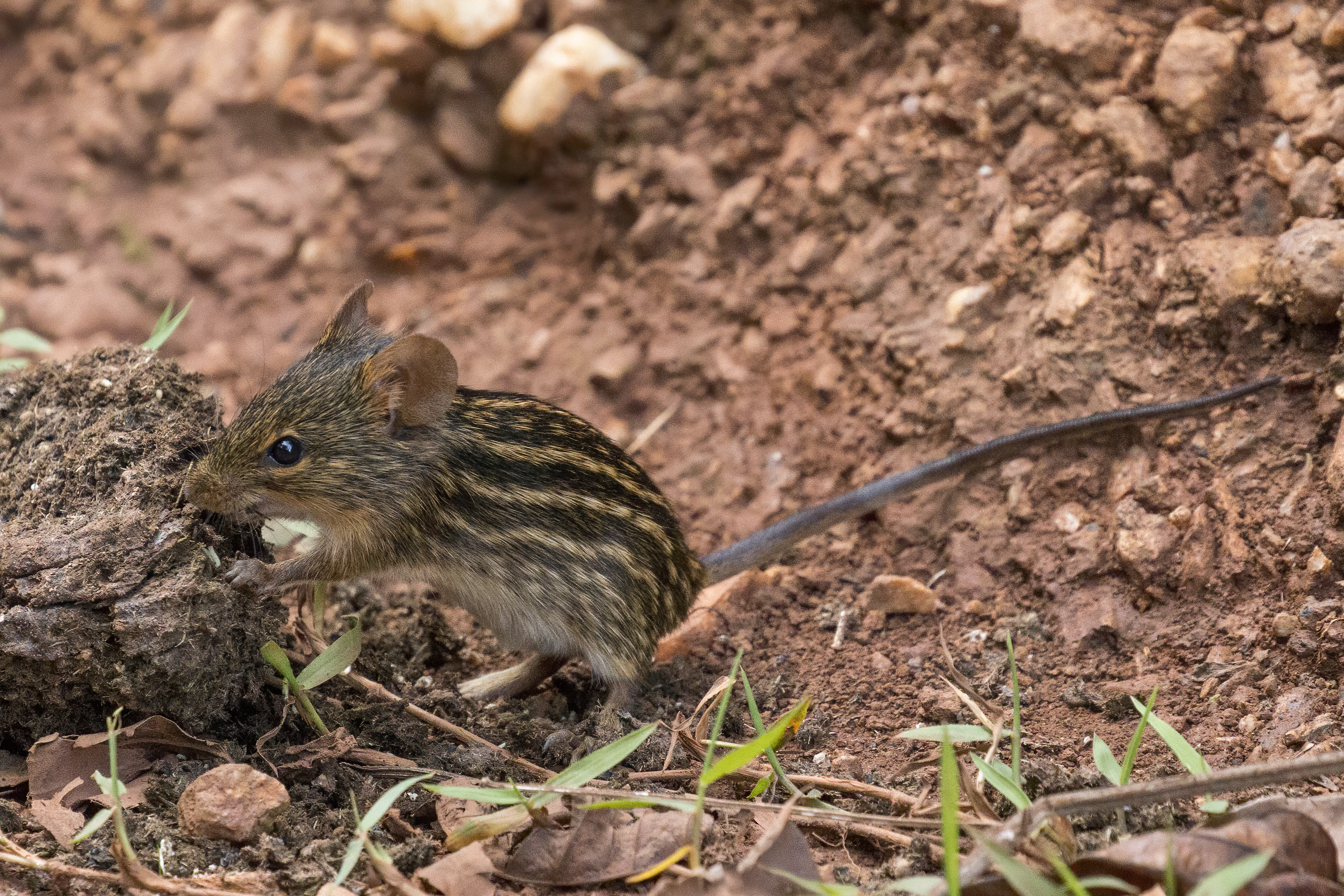
- Kakamega Forest, Kenya

Conservation status
- Least Concern (IUCN 3.1)

Scientific classification
- Kingdom: Animalia
- Phylum: Chordata
- Class: Mammalia
- Order: Rodentia
- Family: Muridae
- Genus: Lemniscomys
- Species: L. striatus

Binomial name
- Lemniscomys striatus (Linnaeus, 1758)

Synonyms
- Mus striatus Linnaeus, 1758; Lemniscomys ardens (Thomas, 1910); L. dieterleni Van der Straeten, 1976; L. fasciatus (Wroughton, 1906); L. luluae Matschie, 1926; L. lynesi Thomas and Hinton, 1923; L. massaicus (Pagenstecher, 1885); L. micropus (Heller, 1911); L. orientalis (Desmarest, 1819); L. pulchella (Gray, 1864); L. pulcher (Wroughton, 1906); L. spermophilus Heller, 1912; L. venustus (Thomas, 1911); L. versustus (Thomas, 1911); L. wroughtoni (Thomas, 1910)

= Typical striped grass mouse =

Species of rodent

The typical striped grass mouse (Lemniscomys striatus) is a small rodent of the suborder Myomorpha in the family Muridae.

== Taxonomy ==
Lemniscomys striatus comprises a complex of various similar species. Furthermore, there are about eleven different species of striped grass mouse, of which Lemniscomys barbarus and Lemniscomys striatus are the two most frequently encountered in captivity.

The species is divided into the following six subspecies:

- L. s. striatus: Guinea Bissau, Guinea, Mali, Burkina Faso, Sierra Leone, Liberia, Ivory Coast, Ghana, Togo, Benin, Nigeria, Cameroon, Central African Republic, DRCongo;
- L. s. ardens (Thomas, 1910): central Kenya and southern Tanzania;
- L. s. dieterleni (Van der Straeten, 1976): eastern DRCongo;
- L. s. luluae (Matschie, 1926): Angola, southern DRCongo;
- L. s. massaicus (Pagenstecher, 1885): South Sudan, Uganda, Tanzania, Ruanda, Burundi, Zambia and southeastern DRCongo;
- L. s. wroughtoni (Thomas, 1910): central and western Ethiopia.

== Description ==
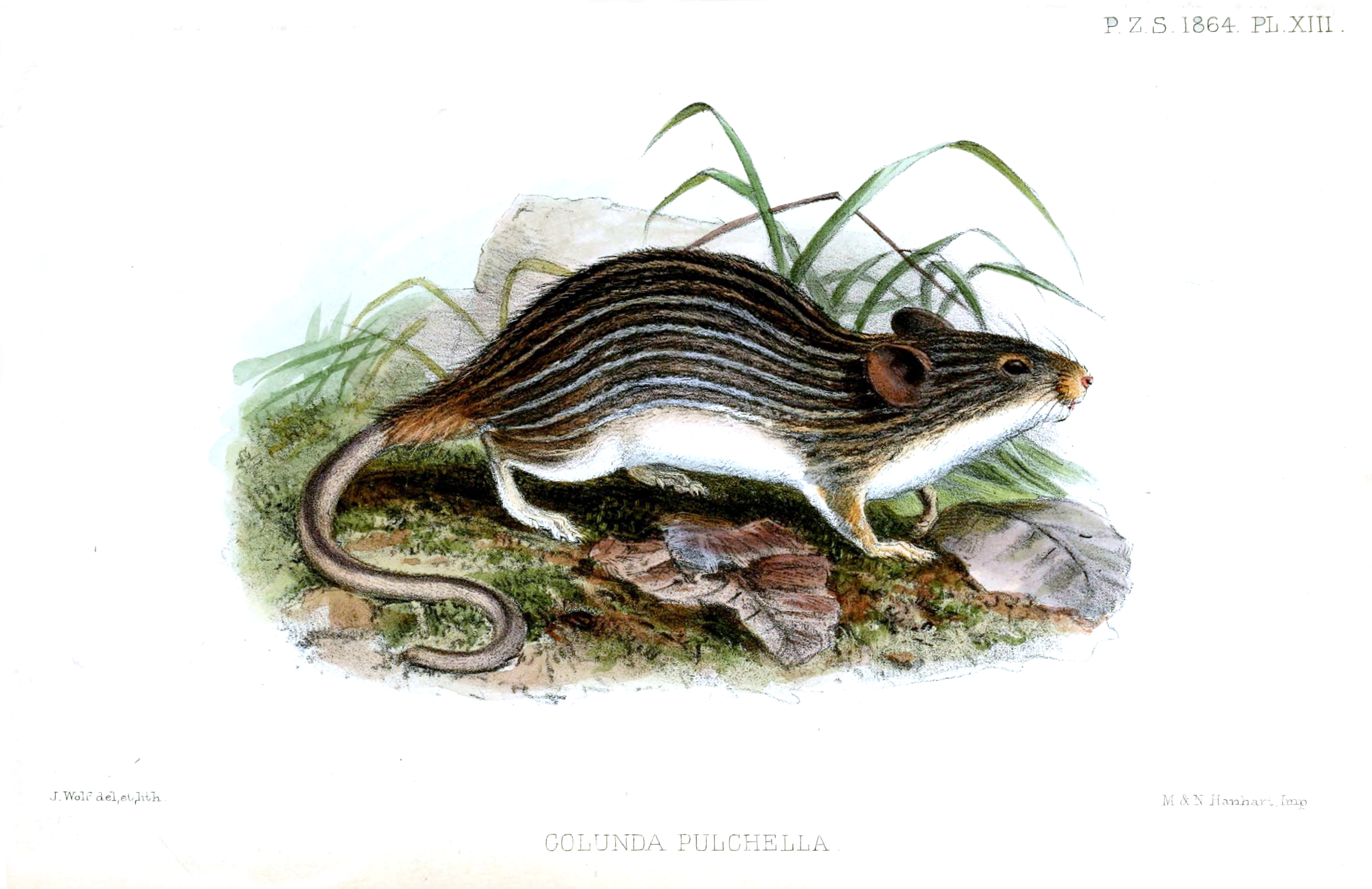
Lemniscomys striatus pulchella from Joseph Wolf – Proceedings of the Zoological Society of London 1864

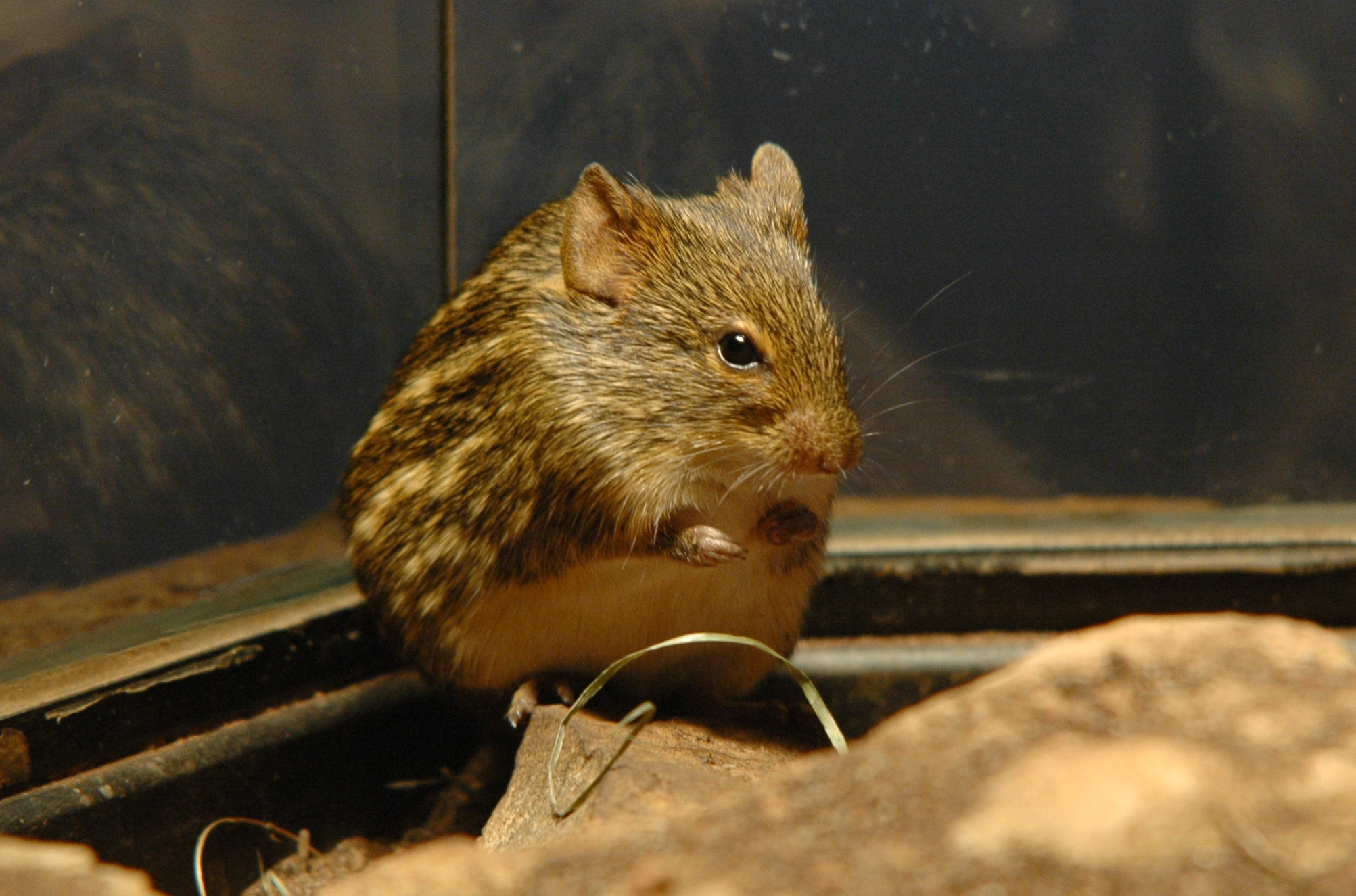
Lemniscomys striatus at the Leipzig Zoo

Lemniscomys striatus is a small rodent, with the length of the head and the body between 93 and 142 mm (3.7 and 5.6 in), the length of the tail between 92 and 155 mm (3.6 and 6.1 in), the length of the foot between 20.5 and 32 mm (0.81 and 1.26 in), the length of the ears between 14 and 17.5 mm (0.55 and 0.69 in) and a weight up to 68 g (2.4 oz). The average adult weight is 42.3 g (1.49 oz).

Its back is blackish-brown, with pale dorsal stripes extended up to the base of the tail and rows of small pale spots on each side of the body. The ventral parts are whitish, with yellowish reflections on the abdomen and chest. Its feet are brownish. Its tail is longer than the head and the body and it is darker above and clearer below. Females have two pairs of pectoral breasts and two inguinal pairs. The karyotype is 2n = 43–44, FN = 58-68-72-74.

== Cycle of life ==
The female reaches sexual maturity at around 168 days, the gestation period is about twenty-five days, and the average number of mice in a litter is 4.54.

The lifespan of the typical striped grass mouse is short. In the wild, they generally do not live much past their first breeding season, but in captivity they may live longer. The maximum age documented for a typical striped grass mouse in captivity is 4.8 years.

== Distribution ==
This species is native to Central and Western Africa. It is widespread in Guinea, Sierra Leone, Ghana, Burkina Faso, Ethiopia, Angola, Kenya, Uganda, Rwanda, DRCongo, Tanzania, Zambia and Malawi.

== Habitat ==
This species lives in deforested areas, grasslands, secondary forest and savanna up to 1,700 metres (5,580 ft) above sea level.
