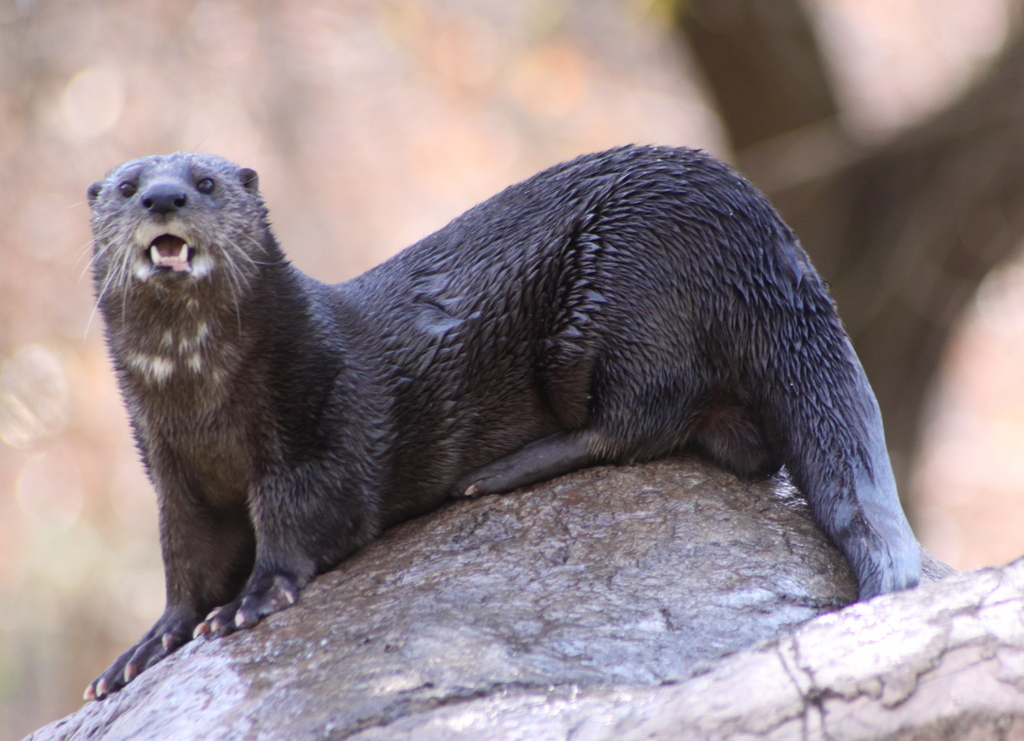

Conservation status
- Near Threatened (IUCN 3.1)
- CITES Appendix II

Scientific classification
- Kingdom: Animalia
- Phylum: Chordata
- Class: Mammalia
- Order: Carnivora
- Family: Mustelidae
- Subfamily: Lutrinae
- Genus: Hydrictis; Pocock, 1921
- Species: H. maculicollis

Binomial name
- Hydrictis maculicollis (Lichtenstein, 1835)
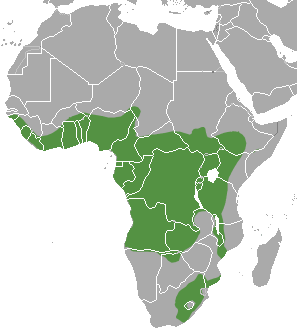
- Distribution of spotted-necked otter

Synonyms
- Lutra maculicollis

= Spotted-necked otter =

Species of carnivore

The spotted-necked otter (Hydrictis maculicollis), or speckle-throated otter, is an otter native to sub-Saharan Africa.

== Description ==
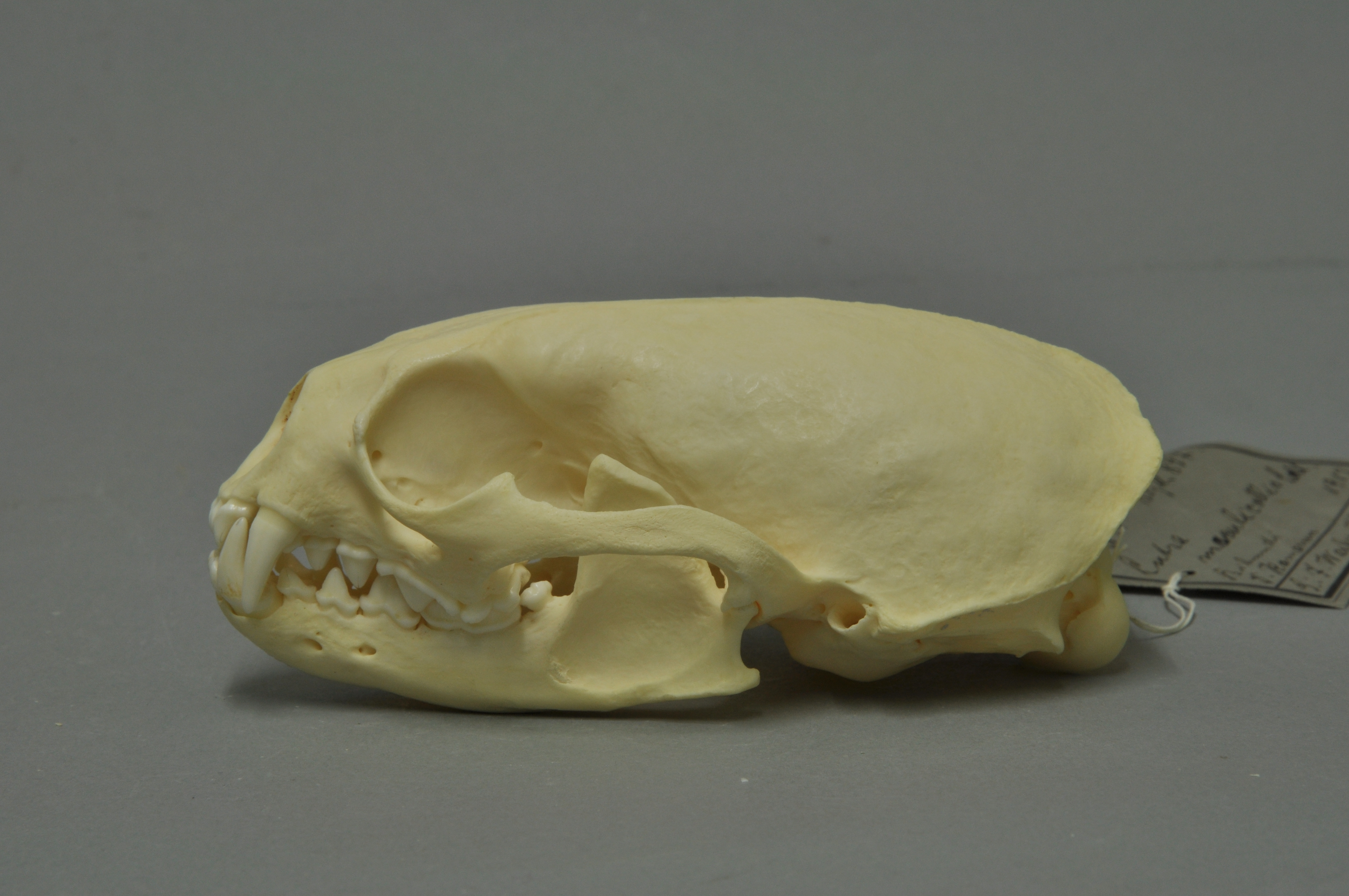
Skull of a spotted-neck otter

The spotted-necked otter is usually chocolate to reddish brown and marked with creamy or white blotches over the chest and throat. The head is broad with a short muzzle, small rounded ears, and a hairless nose pad. The teeth are adapted for consuming fish, with large sharp upper canine teeth, curved lower canines, and sharp carnassial teeth. The jaws are similarly adapted, with the mandibular fossa fitting so snugly into the condyle on the lower jaw that the latter cannot move sideways, making it easier to capture and hold fish. It is a relatively small species, with males measuring 71 to 76 cm (28 to 30 in) from nose to rump, and weighing 5.7 to 6.5 kg (13 to 14 lb), while females are 57 to 61 cm (22 to 24 in) and 3.0 to 4.7 kg (6.6 to 10.4 lb). The tail is long and muscular, measuring 39 to 44 cm (15 to 17 in) in both sexes. It is sleek and has webbed paws. Females have two pairs of teats, and while males have a large scrotum, the penis is hidden beneath the skin, to reduce drag while swimming.

Up to five subspecies have previously been identified, these most likely represent a natural variation in appearance between individuals, and no subspecies are currently recognised.

== Distribution and habitat ==
Spotted-necked otter swimming in Lake Tanganyika.

The spotted-necked otter inhabits lakes and larger rivers throughout much of Africa south of 10°N. It is common in Lake Victoria and across Zambia, but is absent in the Zambezi below Victoria Falls, Zambia. It does not venture into salt water.

== Behavior and ecology ==
The spotted-necked otter is very vocal, uttering high, thin whistles and rapid, shrill chatters. It sometimes lives in family groups, but appears to be social only under certain conditions. Males and females are separated for at least part of the year. They normally hunt alone, except when mothers are training their young, and are not territorial, sheltering through the night in short burrows, rock crevices, or patches of dense vegetation. On land, they travel mainly over regular paths, and rarely move more than 10 m (33 ft) from river or lake banks. Both mark these paths by "sprainting" sites, in which they habitually defecate and urinate.

The spotted-necked otter is diurnal and appears to hunt entirely by sight using short dives of less than 20 seconds each in clear water with good visibility. It carries larger prey ashore, but eats smaller prey while treading water. It primarily eats fish, typically less than 20 cm (7.9 in) in length, but also frogs and small crustaceans, especially when fish is in short supply.

The female bears a litter of up to three young after a gestation period around two months. The young are born blind and helpless, and the mother cares for them for almost a year.

Known predators of the spotted-necked otter include lions, Nile crocodiles and African fish eagles.

== Conservation ==
The spotted-necked otter is in decline, mostly due to habitat destruction and pollution of its clear-water habitats. It is hunted as bushmeat.
