= Jones's roundleaf bat =

Conservation status
- Near Threatened (IUCN 3.1)

Scientific classification
- Kingdom: Animalia
- Phylum: Chordata
- Class: Mammalia
- Order: Chiroptera
- Family: Hipposideridae
- Genus: Hipposideros
- Species: H. jonesi

Binomial name
- Hipposideros jonesi Hayman, 1947
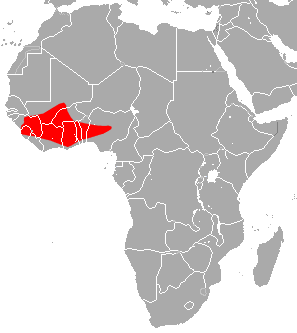
- Jones's roundleaf bat range

Species of bat

Jones's roundleaf bat (Hipposideros jonesi) is a species of bat in the family Hipposideridae. It is endemic to southern West Africa. Its natural habitats are subtropical or tropical dry forest, savanna, subtropical or tropical dry lowland grassland, rocky areas, and caves and other subterranean habitats.

== Taxonomy ==
The holotype was collected by T. S. Jones of the Sierra Leone Department of Agriculture in Makeni in 1947. Upon further examination of the holotype at the British Museum by Hayman, it was recognized as a distinct species. The bat was subsequently named after T. S. Jones.

It belongs to the bicolor species group.

== Description ==
It is a small microbat with a noseleaf and large ears. Both sexes are similar in appearance. It is grayish-brown with an orange phase. The hairs are fine, dense, and silky, and the mid-dorsal hairs are 10-11 mm in length. The dorsal pelage is grayish-brown to a dirty brown. The dorsal hairs are dark gray and gray at the tip. The ventral pelage is lighter, and the ventral hairs are pale gray or brown with a whitish tip. The dorsal pelage on the orange phase is tawny-orange to cinnamon. The wings and the interfemoral membrane are a dark gray in color.

It has a noseleaf with enlarged internarial septum, which partly conceals the nostrils. The noseleaf also has one lateral leaflet on each side, with the frontal sac being absent. The noseleaf is longer than it is broad. The posterior component is elongated, and divided into 4 cells by two prominent lateral septa and one weak middle septum. The upper margin of the noseleaf is strongly curved and is sub-triangular in outline. The anterior component is hairy and broad, covering the muzzle. The internarial septum is pad-like and greatly enlarged, forming a transversely oval disc which partly conceals the nostrils. The bat also lacks an anal sac.

The bat has very large and separated ears. The ears are around 45-60 % of the forearm length, which is relatively long. The ears are broad, sub-triangular, and pointed in shape with only a faint concavity in outer margin below tip. Each ear has 11 internal folds, with the antitragus possessing a distinct fold.

== Biology ==
The bat is insectivorous.

== Habitat and distribution ==
The species has been recorded in Burkina Faso, Ivory Coast, Ghana, Guinea, Liberia, Mali, Nigeria, and Sierra Leone. The species roosts in small groups of several dozen individuals. It is known to roost in caves, boulder caves, true caves, and mine shafts. The bat's range extends through a wide variety of habitats, such as tropical moist forest, arid Sahel vegetation, and from lowland areas into montane regions. It has been recorded up to an elevation of 1350 m.

== Conservation ==
The species has been assessed by the IUCN as near-threatened. It faces threats from degradation of roosting habitat in caves, and may also be threatened by subsistence hunting. The bat's population also depends on the availability of caves as day-roosts. It is not protected by any laws or international agreements, and the presence of the species in protected areas is not known.
