= Bellier's striped grass mouse =

Conservation status
- Least Concern (IUCN 3.1)

Scientific classification
- Kingdom: Animalia
- Phylum: Chordata
- Class: Mammalia
- Order: Rodentia
- Family: Muridae
- Genus: Lemniscomys
- Species: L. bellieri

Binomial name
- Lemniscomys bellieri Van der Straeten, 1975

Species of rodent

Bellier's lemniscomys or Bellier's striped grass mouse (Lemniscomys bellieri) is a species of rodent in the family Muridae. It is found in Burkina Faso, Ivory Coast, Ghana, Guinea, and possibly Sierra Leone. Its natural habitat is typically a dry savanna region.
