= Heuglin's striped grass mouse =

Conservation status
- Least Concern (IUCN 3.1)

Scientific classification
- Kingdom: Animalia
- Phylum: Chordata
- Class: Mammalia
- Order: Rodentia
- Family: Muridae
- Genus: Lemniscomys
- Species: L. zebra

Binomial name
- Lemniscomys zebra (Heuglin, 1864)

Species of rodent

Heuglin's lemniscomys or Heuglin's striped grass mouse (Lemniscomys zebra) is a species of rodent in the family Muridae. It is generally found in Sub-Saharan Africa. Its natural habitats are moist savanna, subtropical or tropical moist shrubland, arable land, and plantations.
