= List of mammals of Mauritania =

This is a list of the mammal species recorded in Mauritania. Of the mammal species in Mauritania, three are critically endangered, nine are vulnerable, and one is near threatened. One of the species listed for Mauritania can no longer be found in the wild.

The following tags are used to highlight each species' conservation status as assessed by the International Union for Conservation of Nature:

EX	Extinct	No reasonable doubt that the last individual has died.
EW	Extinct in the wild	Known only to survive in captivity or as a naturalized populations well outside its previous range.
CR	Critically endangered	The species is in imminent risk of extinction in the wild.
EN	Endangered	The species is facing an extremely high risk of extinction in the wild.
VU	Vulnerable	The species is facing a high risk of extinction in the wild.
NT	Near threatened	The species does not meet any of the criteria that would categorise it as risking extinction but it is likely to do so in the future.
LC	Least concern	There are no current identifiable risks to the species.
DD	Data deficient	There is inadequate information to make an assessment of the risks to this species.

Some species were assessed using an earlier set of criteria. Species assessed using this system have the following instead of near threatened and least concern categories:

LR/cd	Lower risk/conservation dependent	Species which were the focus of conservation programmes and may have moved into a higher risk category if that programme was discontinued.
LR/nt	Lower risk/near threatened	Species which are close to being classified as vulnerable but are not the subject of conservation programmes.
LR/lc	Lower risk/least concern	Species for which there are no identifiable risks.

== Order: Hyracoidea (hyraxes) ==
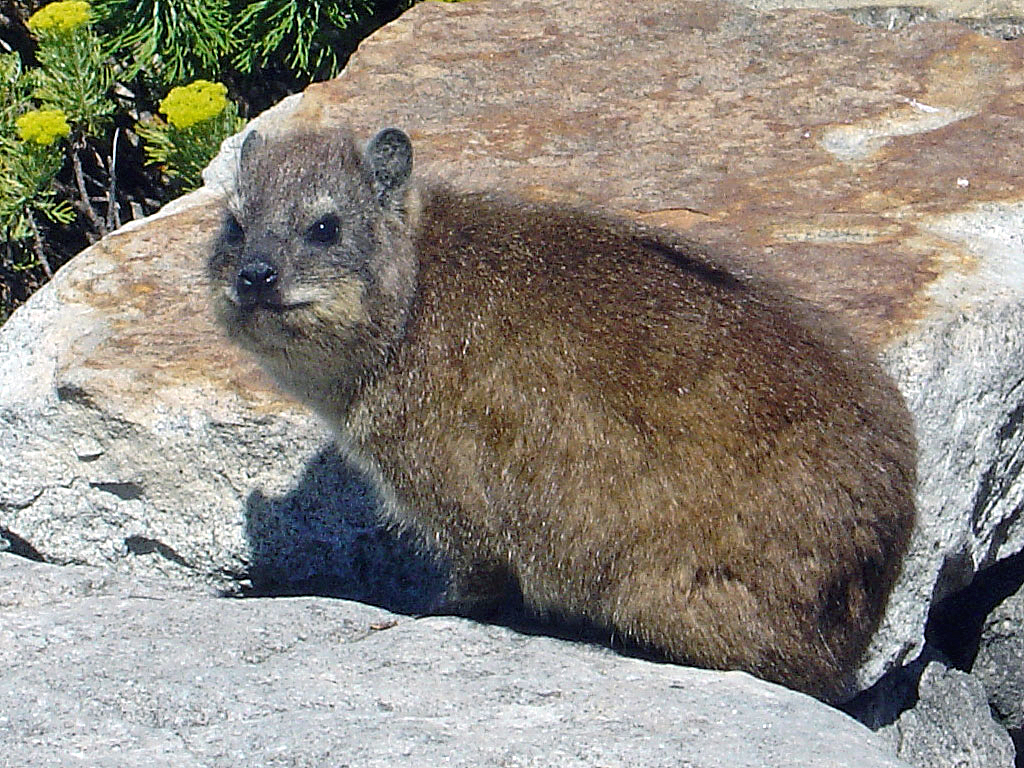
Cape hyrax

The hyraxes are any of four species of fairly small, thickset, herbivorous mammals in the order Hyracoidea. About the size of a domestic cat they are well-furred, with rounded bodies and a stumpy tail. They are native to Africa and the Middle East.

- Family: Procaviidae (hyraxes)
  - Genus: Procavia
    - Cape hyrax, Procavia capensis LC

== Order: Proboscidea (elephants) ==
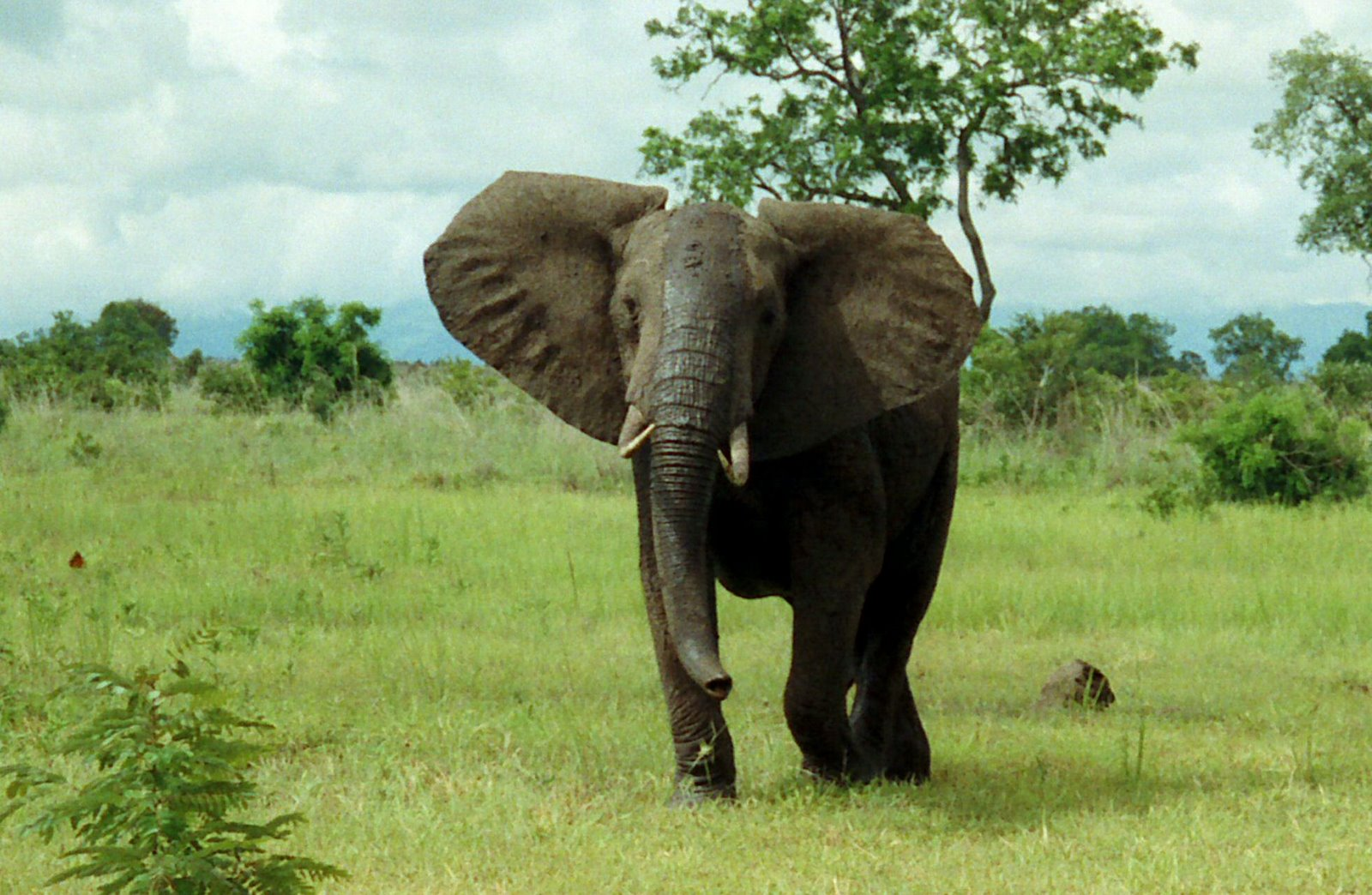
African bush elephant

The elephants comprise three living species and are the largest living land animals.

- Family: Elephantidae (elephants)
  - Genus: Loxodonta
    - African bush elephant, L. africana EN extirpated

== Order: Sirenia (manatees and dugongs) ==
Sirenia is an order of fully aquatic, herbivorous mammals that inhabit rivers, estuaries, coastal marine waters, swamps, and marine wetlands. All four species are endangered.

- Family: Trichechidae
  - Genus: Trichechus
    - African manatee, Trichechus senegalensis VU

== Order: Primates ==
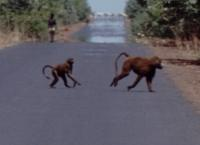
Guinea baboon

The order Primates contains humans and their closest relatives: lemurs, lorisoids, tarsiers, monkeys, and apes.

- Suborder: Haplorhini
  - Infraorder: Simiiformes
    - Parvorder: Catarrhini
      - Superfamily: Cercopithecoidea
        - Family: Cercopithecidae (Old World monkeys)
          - Genus: Erythrocebus
            - Patas monkey, Erythrocebus patas
          - Genus: Chlorocebus
            - Green monkey, Chlorocebus sabaeus
          - Genus: Papio
            - Olive baboon, Papio anubis
            - Guinea baboon, Papio papio

== Order: Rodentia (rodents) ==
Rodents make up the largest order of mammals, with over 40% of mammalian species. They have two incisors in the upper and lower jaw which grow continually and must be kept short by gnawing. Most rodents are small though the capybara can weigh up to 45 kg (99 lb).

- Suborder: Hystricognathi
  - Family: Hystricidae (Old World porcupines)
    - Genus: Hystrix
      - Crested porcupine, Hystrix cristata LC
- Suborder: Sciurognathi
  - Family: Sciuridae (squirrels)
    - Subfamily: Xerinae
      - Tribe: Xerini
        - Genus: Xerus
          - Striped ground squirrel, Xerus erythropus LC
  - Family: Dipodidae (jerboas)
    - Subfamily: Dipodinae
      - Genus: Jaculus
        - Lesser Egyptian jerboa, Jaculus jaculus LC
  - Family: Nesomyidae
    - Subfamily: Cricetomyinae
      - Genus: Cricetomys
        - Gambian pouched rat, Cricetomys gambianus LC
  - Family: Muridae (mice, rats, voles, gerbils, hamsters, etc.)
    - Subfamily: Deomyinae
      - Genus: Acomys
        - Western Saharan spiny mouse, Acomys airensis LC
        - Chudeau's spiny mouse, Acomys chudeaui LC
    - Subfamily: Gerbillinae
      - Genus: Desmodilliscus
        - Pouched gerbil, Desmodilliscus braueri LC
      - Genus: Dipodillus
        - North African gerbil, Dipodillus campestris LC
      - Genus: Gerbillus
        - Lesser Egyptian gerbil, Gerbillus gerbillus LC
        - Mauritania gerbil, Gerbillus mauritaniae DD
        - Balochistan gerbil, Gerbillus nanus LC
        - Nigerian gerbil, Gerbillus nigeriae LC
        - Greater Egyptian gerbil, Gerbillus pyramidum LC
        - Tarabul's gerbil, Gerbillus tarabuli LC
      - Genus: Meriones
        - Libyan jird, Meriones libycus LC
      - Genus: Psammomys
        - Fat sand rat, Psammomys obesus LC
      - Genus: Taterillus
        - Robbins's tateril, Taterillus arenarius LC
        - Senegal gerbil, Taterillus pygargus LC
        - Tranieri's tateril, Taterillus tranieri DD
    - Subfamily: Murinae
      - Genus: Arvicanthis
        - African grass rat, Arvicanthis niloticus LC
      - Genus: Mastomys
        - Guinea multimammate mouse, Mastomys erythroleucus LC
        - Hubert's multimammate mouse, Mastomys huberti LC
        - Natal multimammate mouse, Mastomys natalensis LC
      - Genus: Mus
        - Hausa mouse, Mus haussa LC
  - Family: Ctenodactylidae
    - Genus: Felovia
      - Felou gundi, Felovia vae DD

== Order: Lagomorpha (lagomorphs) ==
The lagomorphs comprise two families, Leporidae (hares and rabbits), and Ochotonidae (pikas). Though they can resemble rodents, and were classified as a superfamily in that order until the early 20th century, they have since been considered a separate order. They differ from rodents in a number of physical characteristics, such as having four incisors in the upper jaw rather than two.

- Family: Leporidae (rabbits, hares)
  - Genus: Lepus
    - Cape hare, L. capensis LC
    - African savanna hare, L. microtis

== Order: Erinaceomorpha (hedgehogs and gymnures) ==
The order Erinaceomorpha contains a single family, Erinaceidae, which comprise the hedgehogs and gymnures. The hedgehogs are easily recognised by their spines while gymnures look more like large rats.

- Family: Erinaceidae (hedgehogs)
  - Subfamily: Erinaceinae
    - Genus: Atelerix
      - Four-toed hedgehog, Atelerix albiventris
    - Genus: Hemiechinus
      - Desert hedgehog, Hemiechinus aethiopicus

== Order: Soricomorpha (shrews, moles, and solenodons) ==
The "shrew-forms" are insectivorous mammals. The shrews and solenodons closely resemble mice while the moles are stout-bodied burrowers.

- Family: Soricidae (shrews)
  - Subfamily: Crocidurinae
    - Genus: Crocidura
      - Cinderella shrew, Crocidura cinderella LC
      - Savanna shrew, Crocidura fulvastra LC
      - Bicolored musk shrew, Crocidura fuscomurina LC
      - Mauritanian shrew, Crocidura lusitania LC
      - Savanna dwarf shrew, Crocidura nanilla LC
      - Saharan shrew, Crocidura tarfayensis DD
      - Savanna path shrew, Crocidura viaria LC

== Order: Chiroptera (bats) ==
The bats' most distinguishing feature is that their forelimbs are developed as wings, making them the only mammals capable of flight. Bat species account for about 20% of all mammals.

- Family: Pteropodidae (flying foxes, Old World fruit bats)
  - Subfamily: Pteropodinae
    - Genus: Eidolon
      - Straw-coloured fruit bat, Eidolon helvum LC
- Family: Vespertilionidae
  - Subfamily: Vespertilioninae
    - Genus: Nycticeinops
      - Schlieffen's bat, Nycticeinops schlieffeni LC
    - Genus: Scotophilus
      - White-bellied yellow bat, Scotophilus leucogaster LC
- Family: Rhinopomatidae
  - Genus: Rhinopoma
    - Egyptian mouse-tailed bat, R. cystops LC
    - Lesser mouse-tailed bat, Rhinopoma hardwickei LC
    - Greater mouse-tailed bat, Rhinopoma microphyllum LC
- Family: Emballonuridae
  - Genus: Taphozous
    - Naked-rumped tomb bat, Taphozous nudiventris LC
    - Egyptian tomb bat, Taphozous perforatus LC
- Family: Nycteridae
  - Genus: Nycteris
    - Gambian slit-faced bat, Nycteris gambiensis LC
    - Hairy slit-faced bat, Nycteris hispida LC
    - Egyptian slit-faced bat, Nycteris thebaica LC
- Family: Rhinolophidae
  - Subfamily: Rhinolophinae
    - Genus: Rhinolophus
      - Rüppell's horseshoe bat, Rhinolophus fumigatus LC
  - Subfamily: Hipposiderinae
    - Genus: Asellia
      - Trident leaf-nosed bat, Asellia tridens LC

== Order: Pholidota (pangolins) ==
The order Pholidota comprises the eight species of pangolin. Pangolins are anteaters and have the powerful claws, elongated snout and long tongue seen in the other unrelated anteater species.

- Family: Manidae
  - Genus: Manis
    - Giant pangolin, M. gigantea EN

== Order: Cetacea (whales) ==
Orcas

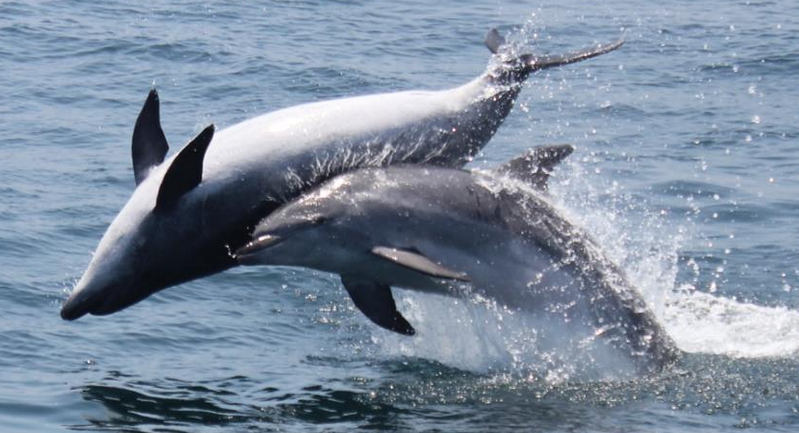
Common bottlenose dolphins playing

The order Cetacea includes whales, dolphins and porpoises. They are the mammals most fully adapted to aquatic life with a spindle-shaped nearly hairless body, protected by a thick layer of blubber, and forelimbs and tail modified to provide propulsion underwater.

- Suborder: Mysticeti
  - Family: Balaenidae (right whales)
    - Genus: Eubalaena
      - North Atlantic right whale CR (Seen historically)
  - Family: Balaenopteridae
    - Subfamily: Balaenopterinae
      - Genus: Balaenoptera
        - Common minke whale, Balaenoptera acutorostrata VU
        - Omura's whale, Balaenoptera omurai DD (the first case found in Atlantic oceans)
        - Bryde's whale, Balaenoptera brydei EN
        - Sei whale, Balaenoptera borealis EN
        - Fin whale, Balaenoptera physalus EN
        - Blue whale, Balaenoptera musculus EN
    - Subfamily: Megapterinae
      - Genus: Megaptera
        - Humpback whale, Megaptera novaeangliae VU
- Suborder: Odontoceti
  - Superfamily: Platanistoidea
    - Family: Phocoenidae
      - Genus: Phocoena
        - Harbour porpoise, Phocoena phocoena VU
    - Family: Physeteridae
      - Genus: Physeter
        - Sperm whale, Physeter macrocephalus VU
    - Family: Kogiidae
      - Genus: Kogia
        - Pygmy sperm whale, Kogia breviceps DD
        - Dwarf sperm whale, Kogia sima DD
    - Family: Ziphidae
      - Genus: Mesoplodon
        - Blainville's beaked whale, Mesoplodon densirostris DD
        - Gervais' beaked whale, Mesoplodon europaeus DD
      - Genus: Ziphius
        - Cuvier's beaked whale, Ziphius cavirostris DD
    - Family: Delphinidae (marine dolphins)
      - Genus: Orcinus
        - Killer whale, Orcinus orca DD
      - Genus: Feresa
        - Pygmy killer whale, Feresa attenuata DD
      - Genus: Pseudorca
        - False killer whale, Pseudorca crassidens DD
      - Genus: Delphinus
        - Short-beaked common dolphin, Delphinus delphis LR/cd
      - Genus: Lagenodelphis
        - Fraser's dolphin, Lagenodelphis hosei DD
      - Genus: Stenella
        - Pantropical spotted dolphin, Stenella attenuata LR/cd
        - Clymene dolphin, Stenella clymene DD
        - Striped dolphin, Stenella coeruleoalba DD
        - Atlantic spotted dolphin, Stenella frontalis DD
        - Spinner dolphin, Stenella longirostris LR/cd
      - Genus: Steno
        - Rough-toothed dolphin, Steno bredanensis DD
      - Genus: Tursiops
        - Common bottlenose dolphin, Tursiops truncatus LC
      - Genus: Globicephala
        - Short-finned pilot whale, Globicephala macrorhynchus DD
      - Genus: Grampus
        - Risso's dolphin, Grampus griseus DD
      - Genus: Peponocephala
        - Melon-headed whale, Peponocephala electra DD

== Order: Carnivora (carnivorans) ==
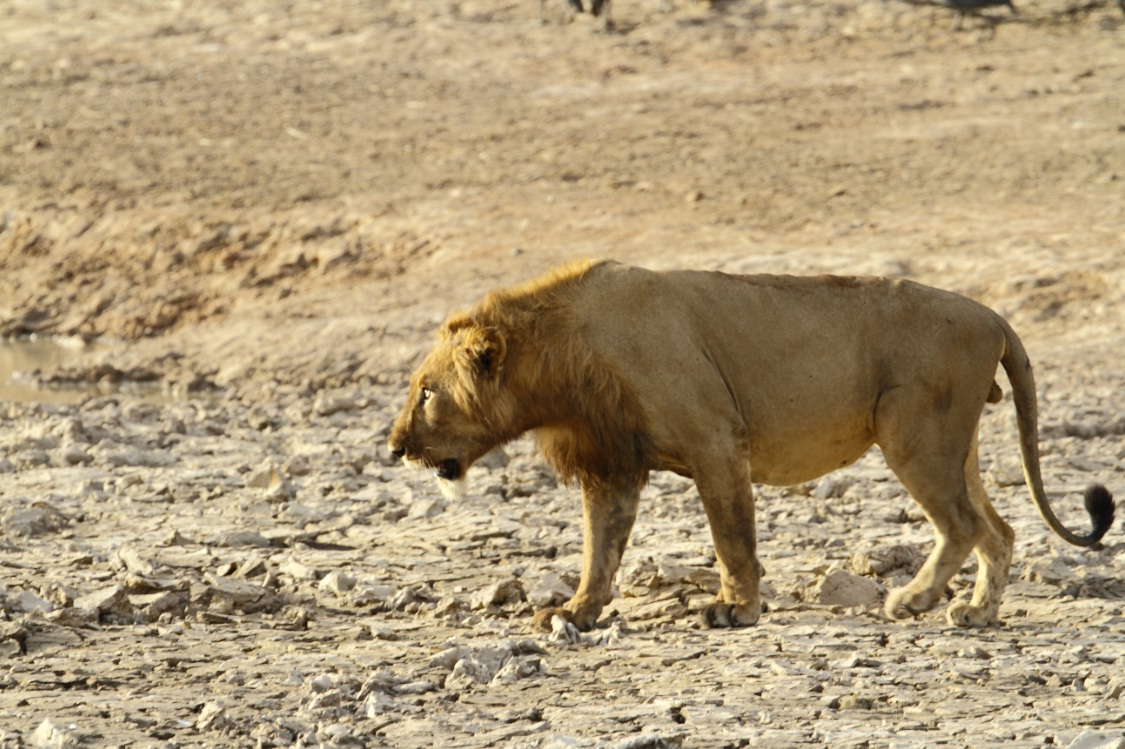
Lion

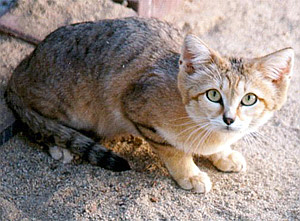
Sand cat

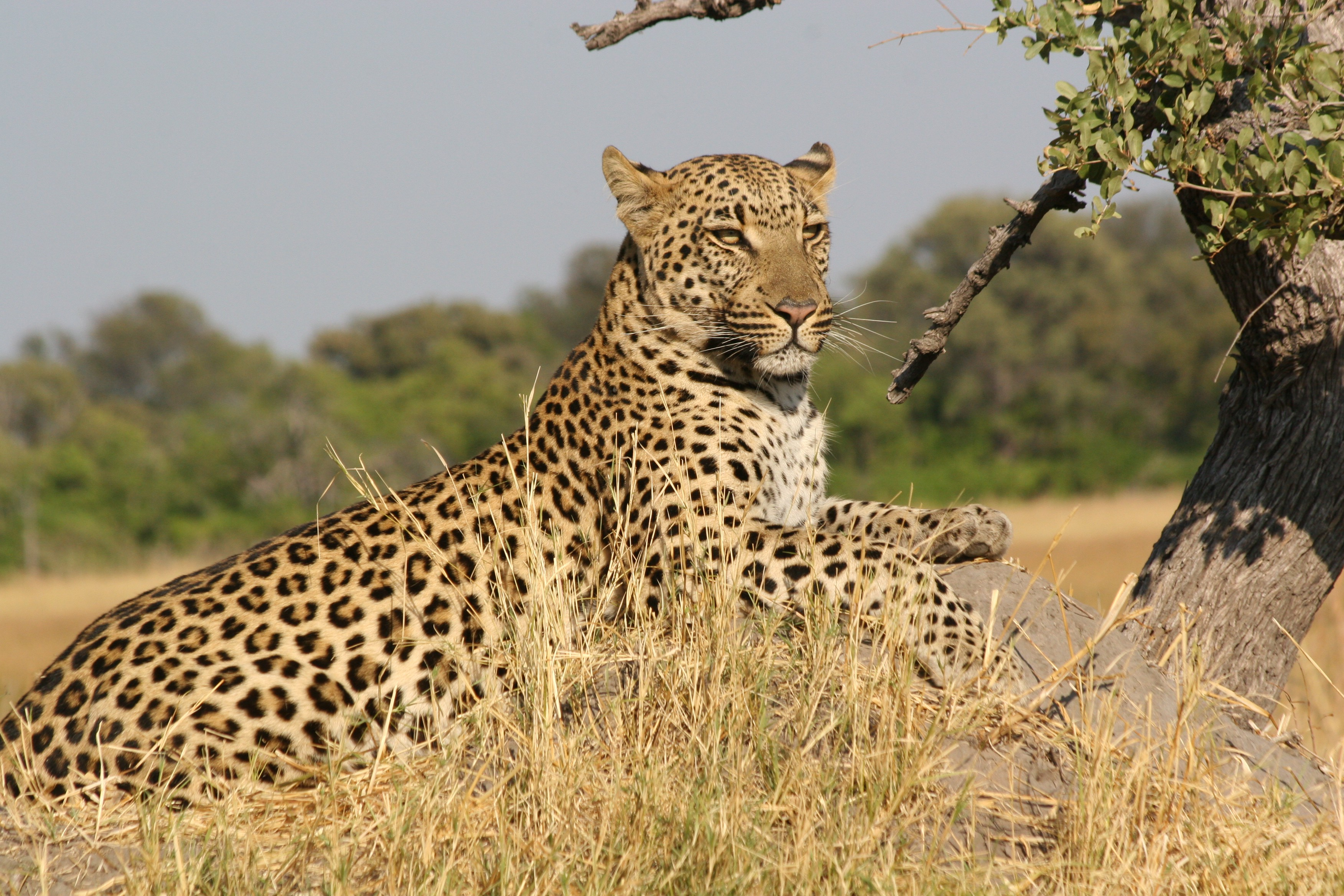
African leopard

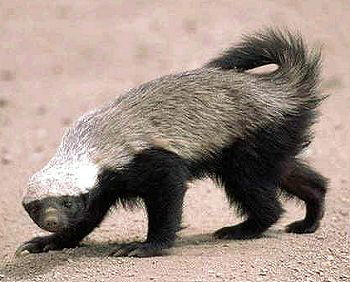
Honey badger

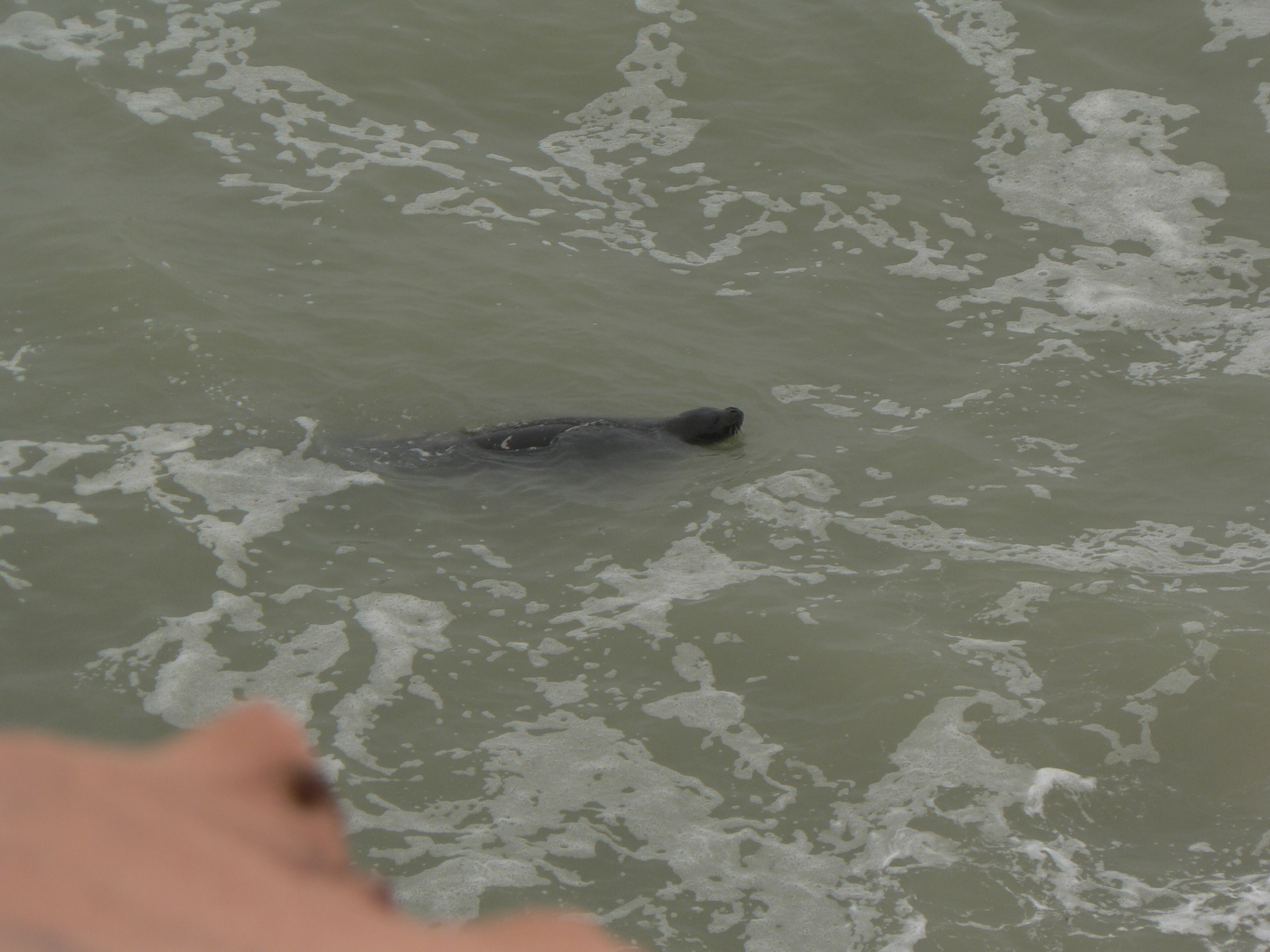
Mediterranean monk seal at Ras Nouadhibou

There are over 260 species of carnivorans, the majority of which eat meat as their primary dietary item. They have a characteristic skull shape and dentition.

- Suborder: Feliformia
  - Family: Felidae (cats)
    - Subfamily: Felinae
      - Genus: Acinonyx
        - Cheetah, Acinonyx jubatus VU
      - Genus: Caracal
        - Caracal, Caracal caracal LC
      - Genus: Felis
        - African wildcat, F. lybica LC
        - Sand cat, F. margarita NT
    - Subfamily: Pantherinae
      - Genus: Panthera
        - Lion, P. leo VU extirpated
        - Leopard, P. pardus VU extirpated
  - Family: Viverridae
    - Subfamily: Viverrinae
      - Genus: Genetta
        - Common genet, Genetta genetta LC
  - Family: Herpestidae (mongooses)
    - Genus: Herpestes
      - Common slender mongoose, Herpestes sanguineus LC
  - Family: Hyaenidae (hyaenas)
    - Genus: Crocuta
      - Spotted hyena, Crocuta crocuta LC
    - Genus: Hyaena
      - Striped hyena, Hyaena hyaena NT
- Suborder: Caniformia
  - Family: Canidae (dogs, foxes)
    - Genus: Vulpes
      - Pale fox, Vulpes pallida LC
      - Rüppell's fox, Vulpes rueppelli LC
      - Fennec, Vulpes zerda LC
    - Genus: Canis
      - African golden wolf, Canis lupaster LC
    - Genus: Lupulella
      - Side-striped jackal, L. adusta LC
    - Genus: Lycaon
      - African wild dog, L. pictus EN extirpated
  - Family: Mustelidae (mustelids)
    - Genus: Ictonyx
      - Saharan striped polecat, Ictonyx libyca LC
      - Striped polecat, Ictonyx striatus LC
    - Genus: Mellivora
      - Honey badger, Mellivora capensis LC
- Suborder: Pinnipedia
  - Family: Phocidae (earless seals)
    - Genus: Monachus
      - Mediterranean monk seal, Monachus monachus EN

== Order: Artiodactyla (even-toed ungulates) ==
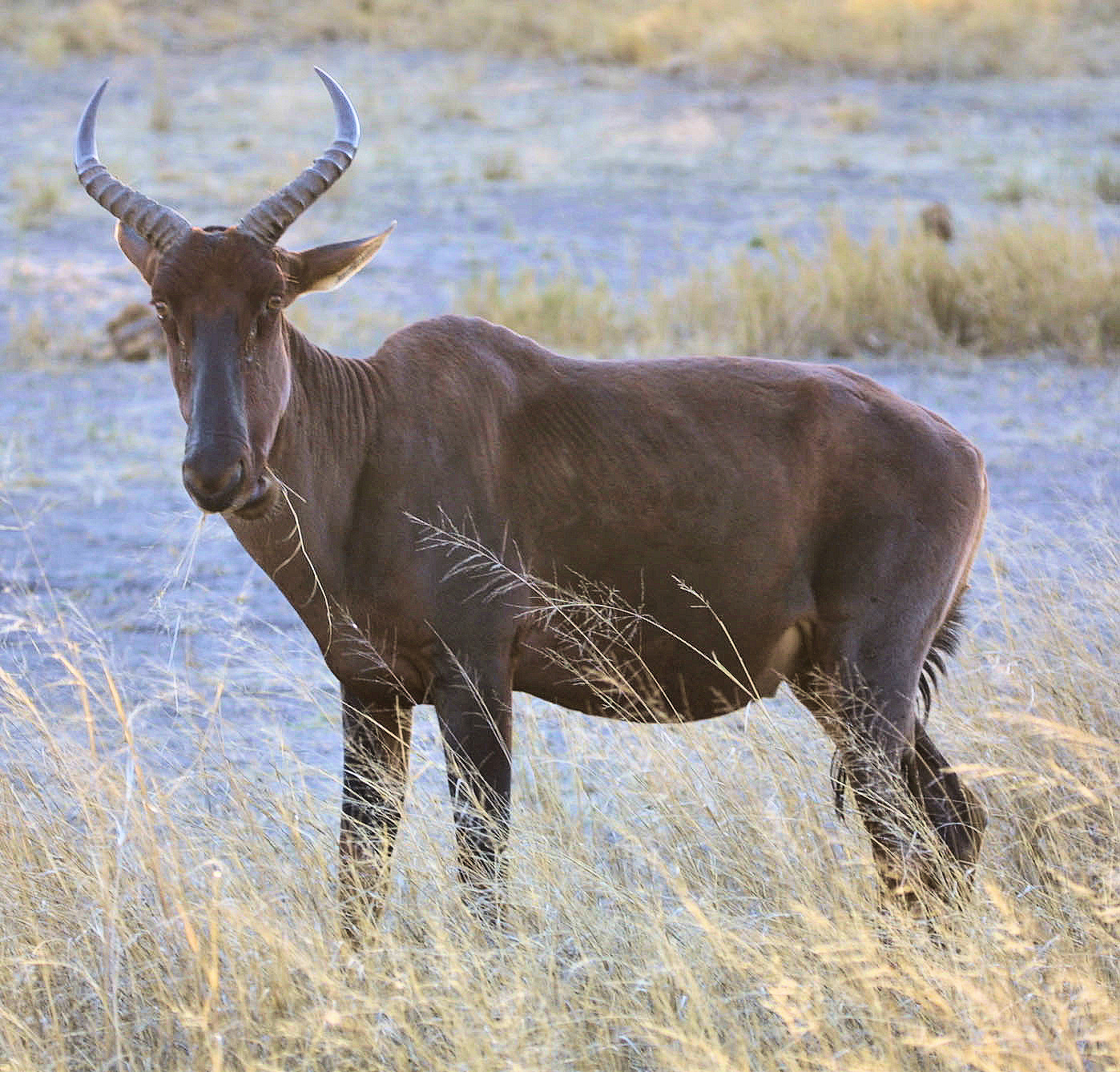
Topi

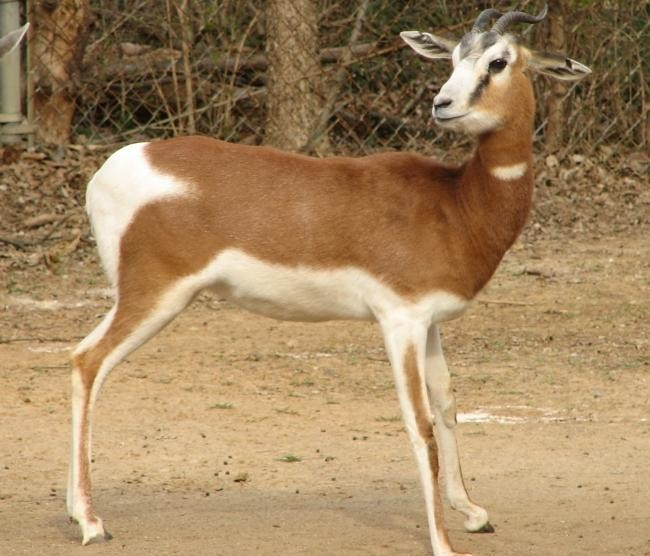
Dama gazelle

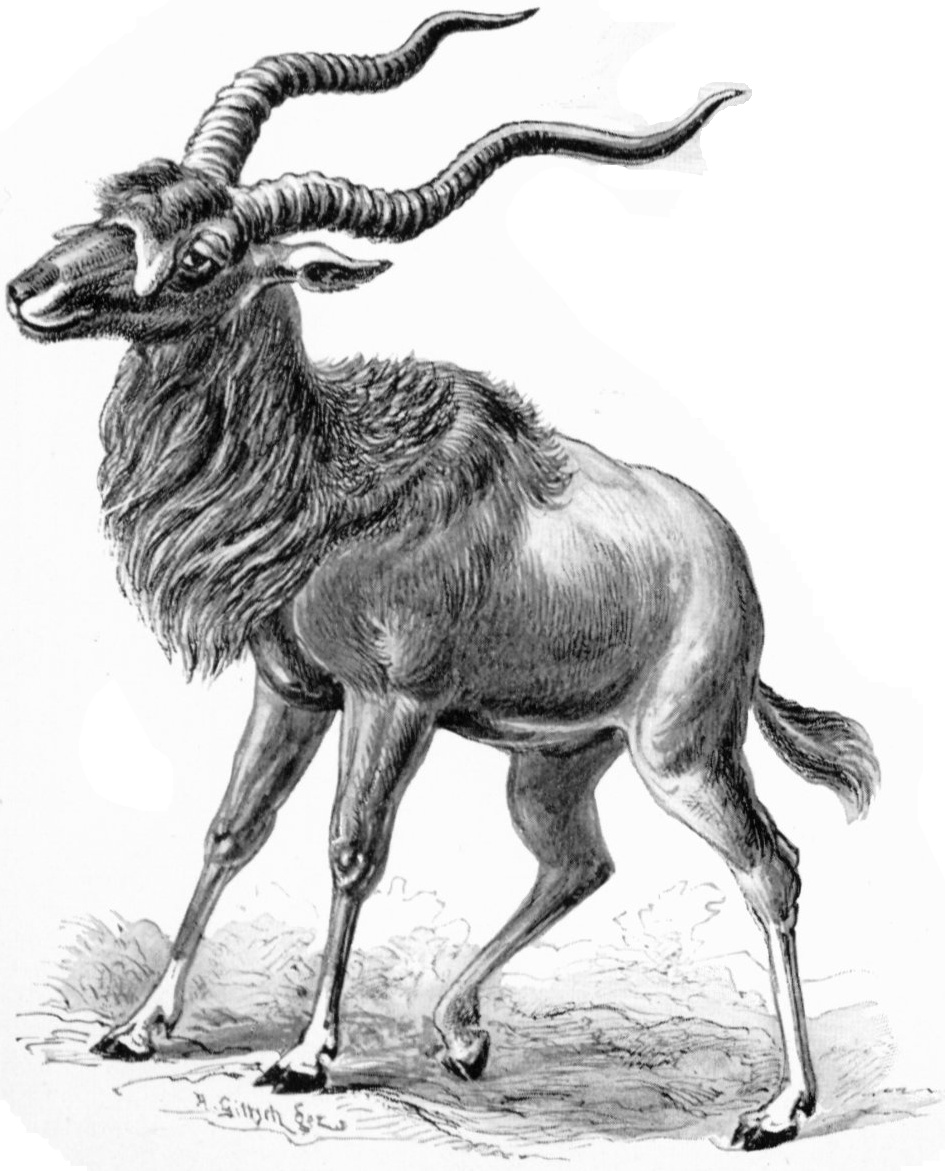
Addax

The even-toed ungulates are ungulates whose weight is borne about equally by the third and fourth toes, rather than mostly or entirely by the third as in perissodactyls. There are about 220 artiodactyl species, including many that are of great economic importance to humans.

- Family: Suidae (pigs)
  - Subfamily: Phacochoerinae
    - Genus: Phacochoerus
      - Common warthog, Phacochoerus africanus LR/lc
- Family: Hippopotamidae (hippopotamuses)
  - Genus: Hippopotamus
    - Hippopotamus, Hippopotamus amphibius VU extirpated
- Family: Giraffidae (giraffe, okapi)
  - Genus: Giraffa
    - Giraffe, Giraffa camelopardalis VU extirpated
- Family: Bovidae (cattle, antelope, sheep, goats)
  - Subfamily: Alcelaphinae
    - Genus: Damaliscus
      - Topi, Damaliscus lunatus LR/cd
  - Subfamily: Antilopinae
    - Genus: Gazella
      - Dorcas gazelle, Gazella dorcas VU
      - Red-fronted gazelle, Gazella rufifrons VU
    - Genus: Nanger
      - Dama gazelle, N. dama CR extirpated
  - Subfamily: Bovinae
    - Genus: Tragelaphus
      - Bushbuck, Tragelaphus scriptus LR/lc
  - Subfamily: Caprinae
    - Genus: Ammotragus
      - Barbary sheep, Ammotragus lervia VU
  - Subfamily: Hippotraginae
    - Genus: Addax
      - Addax, Addax nasomaculatus CR possibly extirpated
    - Genus: Hippotragus
      - Roan antelope, Hippotragus equinus LR/cd
    - Genus: Oryx
      - Scimitar oryx, Oryx dammah EW extirpated
  - Subfamily: Reduncinae
    - Genus: Kobus
      - Kob, Kobus kob LR/cd
    - Genus: Redunca
      - Bohor reedbuck, Redunca redunca LR/cd

== See also ==
- List of chordate orders
- Lists of mammals by region
- List of prehistoric mammals
- Mammal classification
- List of mammals described in the 2000s
- Banc d'Arguin National Park
- Wildlife of Mauritania
