= Harrington's gerbil =

Scientific classification
- Kingdom: Animalia
- Phylum: Chordata
- Class: Mammalia
- Order: Rodentia
- Family: Muridae
- Genus: Taterillus
- Species: T. harringtoni

Binomial name
- Taterillus harringtoni (Thomas, 1906)

Species of rodent

Harrington's gerbil or Harrington's tateril (Taterillus harringtoni) is a species of rodent found in the Central African Republic, Ethiopia, Kenya, Somalia, South Sudan, Tanzania, and Uganda. Its natural habitats are dry savanna, subtropical or tropical dry shrubland, and subtropical or tropical dry lowland grassland. It is sometimes considered to be conspecific with Emin's gerbil, because it has the same karyotype.
