= Lake Chad gerbil =

Conservation status
- Least Concern (IUCN 3.1)

Scientific classification
- Kingdom: Animalia
- Phylum: Chordata
- Class: Mammalia
- Order: Rodentia
- Family: Muridae
- Genus: Taterillus
- Species: T. lacustris

Binomial name
- Taterillus lacustris (Thomas & Wroughton, 1907)

Species of rodent

The Lake Chad gerbil, also known as the Lake Chad tateril (Taterillus lacustris), is a species of rodent native to Cameroon and Nigeria. Its natural habitats include dry savanna, subtropical or tropical dry shrubland, and arable land.
