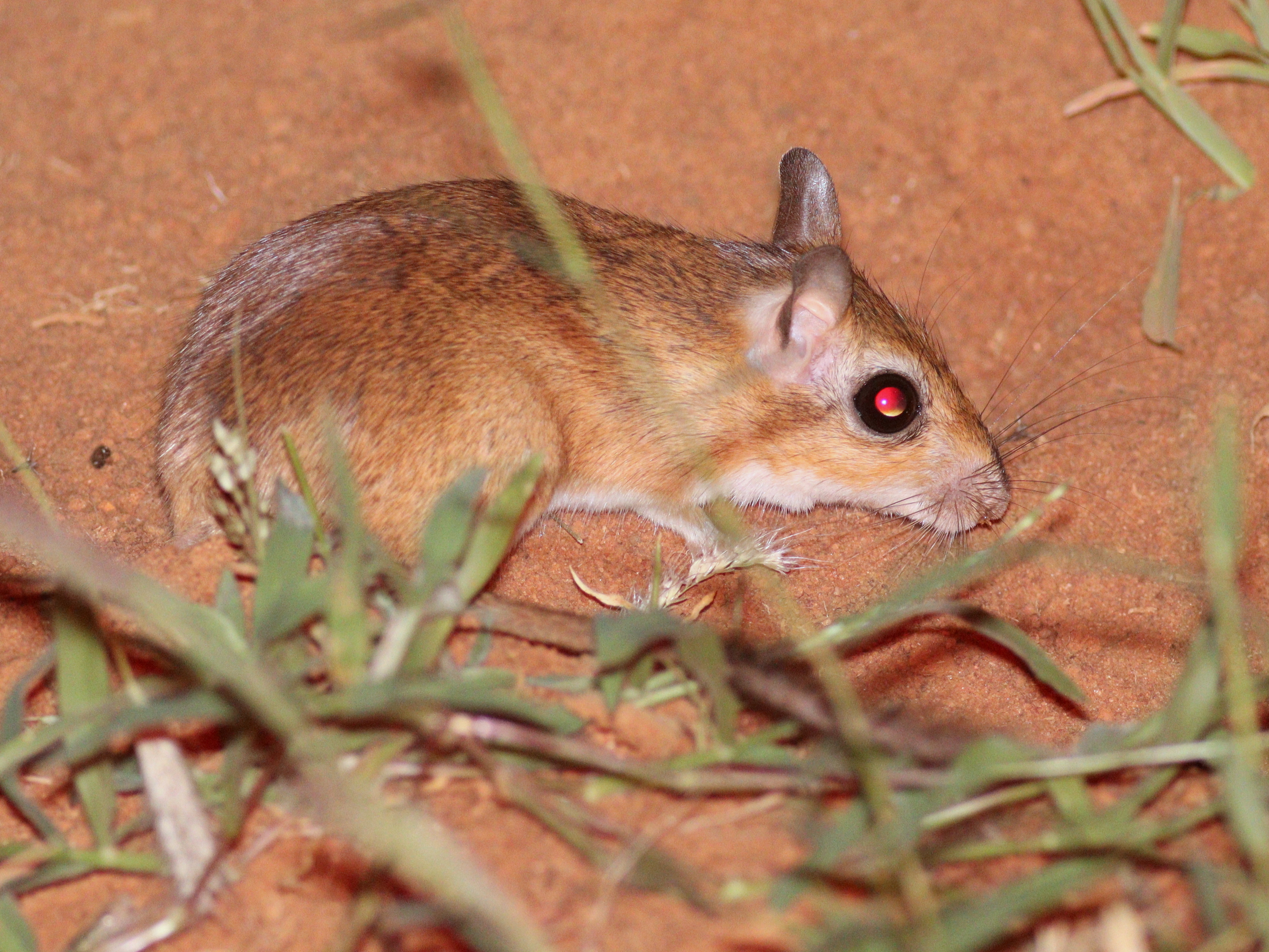

Conservation status
- Least Concern (IUCN 3.1)

Scientific classification
- Kingdom: Animalia
- Phylum: Chordata
- Class: Mammalia
- Order: Rodentia
- Family: Muridae
- Genus: Taterillus
- Species: T. emini

Binomial name
- Taterillus emini (Thomas, 1892)

= Emin's gerbil =

Species of rodent

Emin's gerbil or Emin's tateril (Taterillus emini) is a species of rodent found in the Democratic Republic of the Congo, Ethiopia, Kenya, Sudan, and Uganda. Its natural habitats are dry savanna, subtropical or tropical dry lowland grassland, and arable land.
