= Robbins's tateril =

Conservation status
- Least Concern (IUCN 3.1)

Scientific classification
- Kingdom: Animalia
- Phylum: Chordata
- Class: Mammalia
- Order: Rodentia
- Family: Muridae
- Genus: Taterillus
- Species: T. arenarius

Binomial name
- Taterillus arenarius Robbins, 1974

Species of rodent

Robbins's tateril (Taterillus arenarius), or the Sahel gerbil, is a species of rodent found across Mauritania and possibly Mali and Niger. Its natural habitats are dry savanna and subtropical or tropical dry shrubland.
