= Tranier's tateril =

Conservation status
- Least Concern (IUCN 3.1)

Scientific classification
- Kingdom: Animalia
- Phylum: Chordata
- Class: Mammalia
- Order: Rodentia
- Family: Muridae
- Genus: Taterillus
- Species: T. tranieri

Binomial name
- Taterillus tranieri Dobigny et al., 2003

Species of rodent

Tranier's tateril (Taterillus tranieri) is a species of rodent found in Mali and Mauritania. Its natural habitats are dry savanna, subtropical or tropical dry shrubland, and arable land.
