= Gracile tateril =

Conservation status
- Least Concern (IUCN 3.1)

Scientific classification
- Kingdom: Animalia
- Phylum: Chordata
- Class: Mammalia
- Order: Rodentia
- Family: Muridae
- Genus: Taterillus
- Species: T. gracilis

Binomial name
- Taterillus gracilis (Thomas, 1892)

Species of rodent

The gracile tateril or slender gerbil (Taterillus gracilis) is a species of rodent found in Burkina Faso, Chad, Gambia, Ghana, Guinea, Ivory Coast, Mali, Niger, Nigeria, Senegal, Togo, and possibly Cameroon. Its natural habitats are dry savanna, arable land, pastureland, and rural gardens. It is a common species, sometimes considered an agricultural pest, and the International Union for Conservation of Nature has rated its conservation status as being of "least concern".

== Description ==
The gracile tateril is a small to medium-sized gerbil with a head-and-body length averaging 115 mm (4.5 in) and a tail averaging 156 mm (6.1 in). The muzzle is pointed and often has dark markings, the cheeks are white and there are white patches above and behind the eye. The eyes are large and the ears are long. The upper parts of the body are yellowish-brown or reddish-brown, the individual hairs having grey shafts, and golden yellow or orange-brown tips. The underparts are whitish, the hairs being grey near the base and white near the tip. The two areas of colour are clearly demarcated on the flanks. The feet are pale on the upper surface and the hind feet are dark and nearly naked below. The tail is clad in short hairs and has a bushy, dark-coloured "pencil" at its tip.

== Distribution and habitat ==
The gracile tateril has a wide distribution in Africa south of the Sahara Desert. Its range extends from Senegal in the west to Nigeria and western Chad. Its typical habitat is dry savannah woodland and scrubland where the annual precipitation is at least 400 mm (16 in). It appreciates soils rich in clay and is often found in areas supporting trees and shrubs in the family Combretaceae.

== Ecology ==
The gracile tateril is nocturnal. It excavates a simple, unbranched and rather vertical, burrow. It is an omnivore, feeding mostly on seeds, leaves and stems, but also consuming insects, especially in the dry season. At this time of year it makes use of the bodily reserves of fat it has built up during the wet season.
