= Voi shrew =

Conservation status
- Least Concern (IUCN 3.1)

Scientific classification
- Kingdom: Animalia
- Phylum: Chordata
- Class: Mammalia
- Order: Eulipotyphla
- Family: Soricidae
- Genus: Crocidura
- Species: C. voi

Binomial name
- Crocidura voi Osgood, 1910
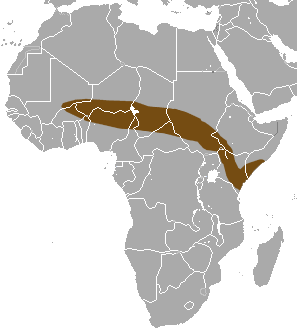
- Voi shrew range

Species of mammal

The Voi shrew (Crocidura voi) is a species of mammal in the family Soricidae. It is found in Benin, Burkina Faso, Cameroon, Central African Republic, Chad, Ethiopia, Ghana, Kenya, Mali, Niger, Nigeria, Somalia, Sudan, and Togo. Its natural habitat is dry savanna.
