= Petter's gerbil =

Conservation status
- Least Concern (IUCN 3.1)

Scientific classification
- Kingdom: Animalia
- Phylum: Chordata
- Class: Mammalia
- Order: Rodentia
- Family: Muridae
- Genus: Taterillus
- Species: T. petteri

Binomial name
- Taterillus petteri Gautun, Tranier & Sicard, 1985

Species of rodent

Petter's gerbil or Petter's tateril (Taterillus petteri) is a species of rodent found in Burkina Faso, Mali, and Niger. Its natural habitats are dry savanna, subtropical or tropical dry shrubland, arable land, and rural gardens.
