= Nigerian gerbil =

Conservation status
- Least Concern (IUCN 3.1)

Scientific classification
- Kingdom: Animalia
- Phylum: Chordata
- Class: Mammalia
- Order: Rodentia
- Family: Muridae
- Genus: Gerbillus
- Species: G. nigeriae

Binomial name
- Gerbillus nigeriae Thomas & Hinton, 1920

Species of rodent

The Nigerian gerbil (Gerbillus nigeriae) is distributed mainly in northern Nigeria and Burkina Faso.
