= Mauritanian shrew =

Conservation status
- Least Concern (IUCN 3.1)

Scientific classification
- Kingdom: Animalia
- Phylum: Chordata
- Class: Mammalia
- Order: Eulipotyphla
- Family: Soricidae
- Genus: Crocidura
- Species: C. lusitania

Binomial name
- Crocidura lusitania Dollman, 1915
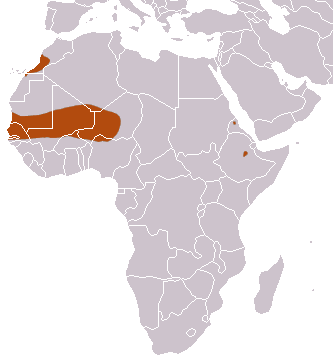
- Mauritanian shrew range

Species of mammal

The Mauritanian shrew (Crocidura lusitania) is a species of mammal in the family Soricidae. It is found in Algeria, Burkina Faso, Eritrea, Ethiopia, Gambia, Guinea, Guinea-Bissau, Mali, Mauritania, Morocco, Niger, Nigeria, Senegal, Sierra Leone. Its natural habitats are dry savanna and subtropical or tropical dry shrubland.
