= Hubert's multimammate mouse =

Conservation status
- Least Concern (IUCN 3.1)

Scientific classification
- Kingdom: Animalia
- Phylum: Chordata
- Class: Mammalia
- Order: Rodentia
- Family: Muridae
- Genus: Mastomys
- Species: M. huberti

Binomial name
- Mastomys huberti (Wroughton, 1909)

Species of rodent

Hubert's multimammate mouse, or Hubert's mastomys (Mastomys huberti) is a species of rodent in the family Muridae found in Burkina Faso, Gambia, Mali, Mauritania, Nigeria, and Senegal, and possibly Guinea, Guinea-Bissau, and Niger. Its natural habitats are dry savanna, subtropical or tropical seasonally wet or flooded lowland grassland, arable land, rural gardens, urban areas, irrigated land, and seasonally flooded agricultural land.

== Sources ==
- Musser, G. G.; Carleton, M. D. (2005). "Superfamily Muroidea". In Wilson, D. E.; Reeder, D. M. (eds.). Mammal Species of the World: A Taxonomic and Geographic Reference (3rd ed.). Johns Hopkins University Press. pp. 894–1531. ISBN 978-0-8018-8221-0. OCLC 62265494.
