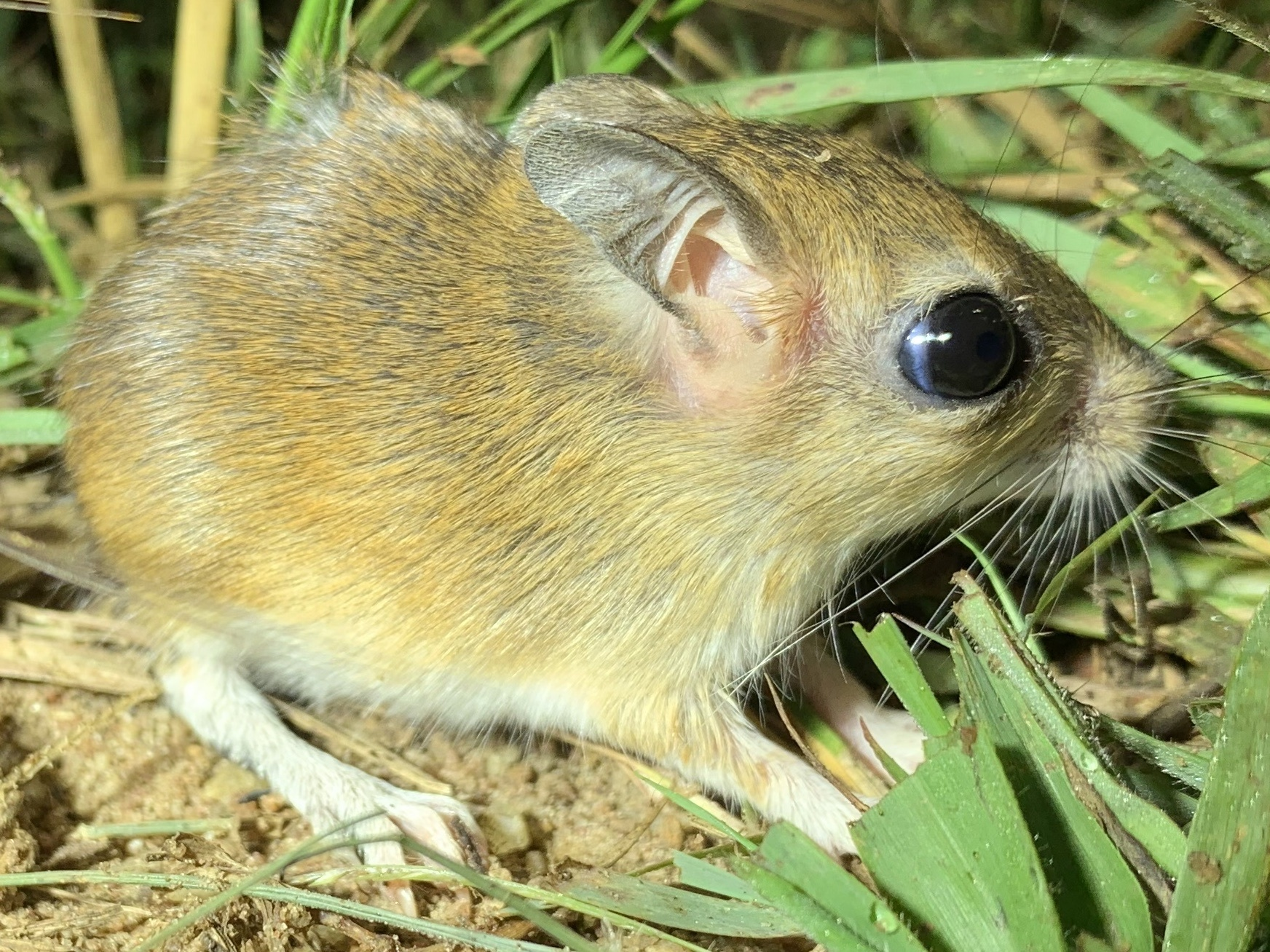

Scientific classification
- Domain: Eukaryota
- Kingdom: Animalia
- Phylum: Chordata
- Class: Mammalia
- Order: Rodentia
- Family: Muridae
- Tribe: Taterillini
- Genus: Taterillus; Thomas, 1910

Type species
- Gerbillus emini

= Taterillus =

Taterillus Temporal range: Late Pliocene–Recent

Genus of rodents

Taterillus is a genus of rodents. The species within this genus can only be reliably distinguished on the basis of karyotype, and not by external appearance.

The genus contains the following species:

- Robbins's tateril (Taterillus arenarius)
- Congo gerbil (Taterillus congicus)
- Emin's gerbil (Taterillus emini)
- Gracile tateril (Taterillus gracilis)
- Harrington's gerbil (Taterillus harringtoni) – doubtfully distinct from T. emini, which has the same chromosome count.
- Lake Chad gerbil (Taterillus lacustris)
- Petter's gerbil (Taterillus petteri)
- Senegal gerbil (Taterillus pygargus)
- Tranieri's tateril (Taterillus tranieri)
