= Senegal gerbil =

Conservation status
- Least Concern (IUCN 3.1)

Scientific classification
- Kingdom: Animalia
- Phylum: Chordata
- Class: Mammalia
- Order: Rodentia
- Family: Muridae
- Genus: Taterillus
- Species: T. pygargus

Binomial name
- Taterillus pygargus (F. Cuvier, 1838)

Species of rodent

The Senegal gerbil or Senegal tateril (Taterillus pygargus) is a species of rodent found in Niger, Senegal, possibly Gambia, possibly Mali, and possibly Mauritania. Its natural habitats are dry savanna, subtropical or tropical dry shrubland, arable land, pastureland, and rural gardens.
