= Cinderella shrew =

Conservation status
- Least Concern (IUCN 3.1)

Scientific classification
- Kingdom: Animalia
- Phylum: Chordata
- Class: Mammalia
- Infraclass: Placentalia
- Order: Eulipotyphla
- Family: Soricidae
- Genus: Crocidura
- Species: C. cinderella

Binomial name
- Crocidura cinderella Thomas, 1911
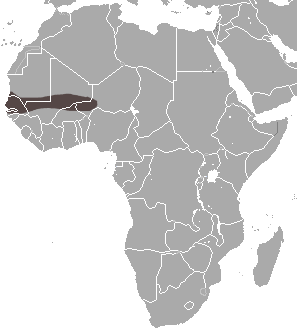
- Cinderella shrew range

Species of mammal

The cinderella shrew (Crocidura cinderella) is a species of mammal in the family Soricidae. It is found in Burkina Faso, Gambia, Guinea-Bissau, Mali, Mauritania, Niger, and Senegal. Its natural habitat is dry savanna.

== See Also ==
Cinderella fat-tailed mouse opossum (Thylamys cinderella)
