= List of mammals of Oman =

This is a list of the mammal species recorded in Oman. There are at least 62 mammal species in Oman that have been assessed by the International Union for Conservation of Nature (IUCN), of these, one is critically endangered, four are endangered, eight are vulnerable, and two are near threatened.

The following tags are used to highlight each species' conservation status as assessed by the IUCN:

EX	Extinct	No reasonable doubt that the last individual has died.
EW	Extinct in the wild	Known only to survive in captivity or as a naturalized populations well outside its previous range.
CR	Critically endangered	The species is in imminent risk of extinction in the wild.
EN	Endangered	The species is facing an extremely high risk of extinction in the wild.
VU	Vulnerable	The species is facing a high risk of extinction in the wild.
NT	Near threatened	The species does not meet any of the criteria that would categorise it as risking extinction but it is likely to do so in the future.
LC	Least concern	There are no current identifiable risks to the species.
DD	Data deficient	There is inadequate information to make an assessment of the risks to this species.

== Order: Hyracoidea (hyraxes) ==
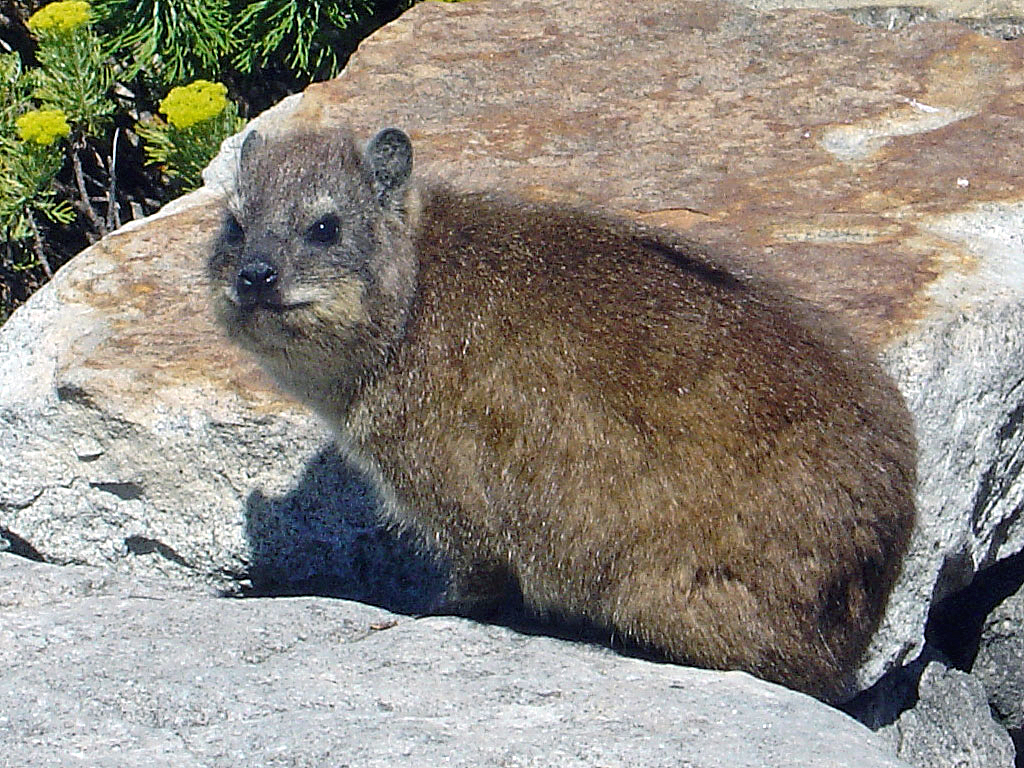
Cape hyrax

The hyraxes are any of four species of fairly small, thickset, herbivorous mammals in the order Hyracoidea. About the size of a domestic cat they are well-furred, with rounded bodies and a stumpy tail. They are native to Africa and the Middle East.

- Family: Procaviidae (hyraxes)
  - Genus: Procavia
    - Cape hyrax, P. capensis LC

== Order: Sirenia (manatees and dugongs) ==
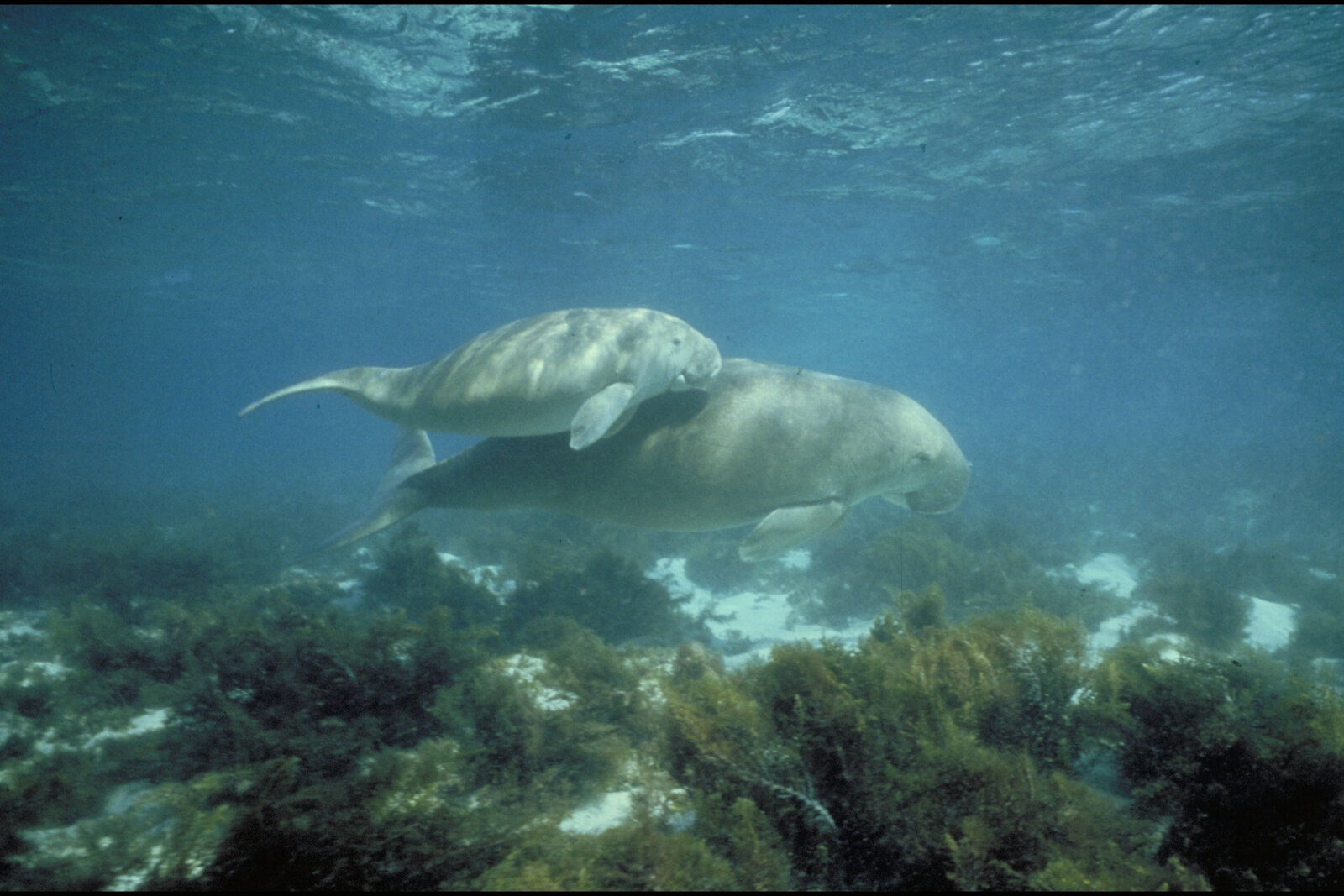
Dugongs

Sirenia is an order of fully aquatic, herbivorous mammals that inhabit rivers, estuaries, coastal marine waters, swamps, and marine wetlands. All four species are endangered.

- Family: Dugongidae
  - Genus: Dugong
    - Dugong, D. dugon VU

== Order: Rodentia (rodents) ==
Rodents make up the largest order of mammals, with over 40% of mammalian species. They have two incisors in the upper and lower jaw which grow continually and must be kept short by gnawing. Most rodents are small though the capybara can weigh up to 45 kg (99 lb).

- Suborder: Sciurognathi
  - Family: Dipodidae (jerboas)
    - Subfamily: Dipodinae
      - Genus: Jaculus
        - Lesser Egyptian jerboa, J. jaculus LC
  - Family: Muridae (mice, rats, voles, gerbils, hamsters, etc.)
    - Subfamily: Deomyinae
      - Genus: Acomys
        - Cairo spiny mouse, Acomys cahirinus LC
        - Golden spiny mouse, Acomys russatus LC
    - Subfamily: Gerbillinae
      - Genus: Gerbillus
        - Cheesman's gerbil, Gerbillus cheesmani LC
        - Wagner's gerbil, Gerbillus dasyurus LC
        - Pygmy gerbil, Gerbillus henleyi LC
        - Balochistan gerbil, Gerbillus nanus LC
      - Genus: Meriones
        - Arabian jird, Meriones arimalius EN

== Order: Lagomorpha (lagomorphs) ==
Lagomorphs comprise rabbits, hares, and pikas. Unlike rodents, they have four incisors on their upper jaws.

- Family: Leporidae (rabbits and hares)
  - Genus: Lepus
    - Cape hare, L. capensis LC

== Order: Erinaceomorpha (hedgehogs and gymnures) ==
The order Erinaceomorpha contains a single family, Erinaceidae, which comprise the hedgehogs and gymnures. The hedgehogs are easily recognised by their spines while gymnures look more like large rats.

- Family: Erinaceidae (hedgehogs)
  - Subfamily: Erinaceinae
    - Genus: Paraechinus
      - Desert hedgehog, P. aethiopicus LC

== Order: Soricomorpha (shrews, moles, and solenodons) ==
The "shrew-forms" are insectivorous mammals. The shrews and solenodons closely resemble mice while the moles are stout-bodied burrowers.

- Family: Soricidae (shrews)
  - Subfamily: Crocidurinae
    - Genus: Crocidura
      - Arabian shrew, C. arabica LC
      - Dhofar shrew, C. dhofarensis DD

== Order: Chiroptera (bats) ==
The bats' most distinguishing feature is that their forelimbs are developed as wings, making them the only mammals capable of flight. Bat species account for about 20% of all mammals.

- Family: Pteropodidae (flying foxes, Old World fruit bats)
  - Subfamily: Pteropodinae
    - Genus: Rousettus
      - Egyptian fruit bat, Rousettus aegyptiacus LC
- Family: Vespertilionidae
  - Subfamily: Myotinae
    - Genus: Myotis
      - Geoffroy's bat, Myotis emarginatus LC
  - Subfamily: Vespertilioninae
    - Genus: Eptesicus
      - Botta's serotine, Eptesicus bottae LC
    - Genus: Hypsugo
      - Arabian pipistrelle, Hypsugo arabicus DD
      - Bodenheimer's pipistrelle, Hypsugo bodenheimeri DD
    - Genus: Otonycteris
      - Desert long-eared bat, Otonycteris hemprichii LC
    - Genus: Pipistrellus
      - Kuhl's pipistrelle, Pipistrellus kuhlii LC
    - Genus: Rhyneptesicus
      - Sind bat, R. nasutus LC
- Family: Rhinopomatidae
  - Genus: Rhinopoma
    - Egyptian mouse-tailed bat, R. cystops LC
    - Lesser mouse-tailed bat, Rhinopoma hardwickii LC
    - Greater mouse-tailed bat, Rhinopoma microphyllum LC
    - Small mouse-tailed bat, Rhinopoma muscatellum LC
- Family: Molossidae
  - Genus: Tadarida
    - Egyptian free-tailed bat, Tadarida aegyptiaca LC
- Family: Rhinolophidae
  - Subfamily: Rhinolophinae
    - Genus: Rhinolophus
      - Blasius's horseshoe bat, R. blasii LC
      - Geoffroy's horseshoe bat, Rhinolophus clivosus LC
  - Subfamily: Hipposiderinae
    - Genus: Asellia
      - Trident leaf-nosed bat, Asellia tridens LC
    - Genus: Triaenops
      - Persian trident bat, Triaenops persicus LC

== Order: Cetacea (whales) ==
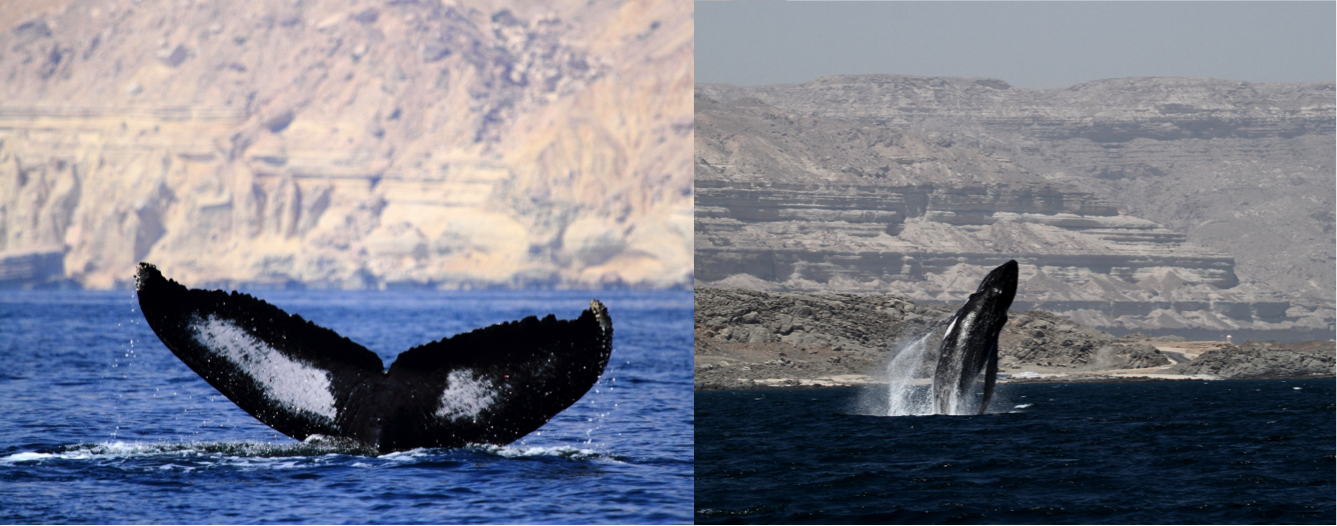
Humpback whales off Dhofar

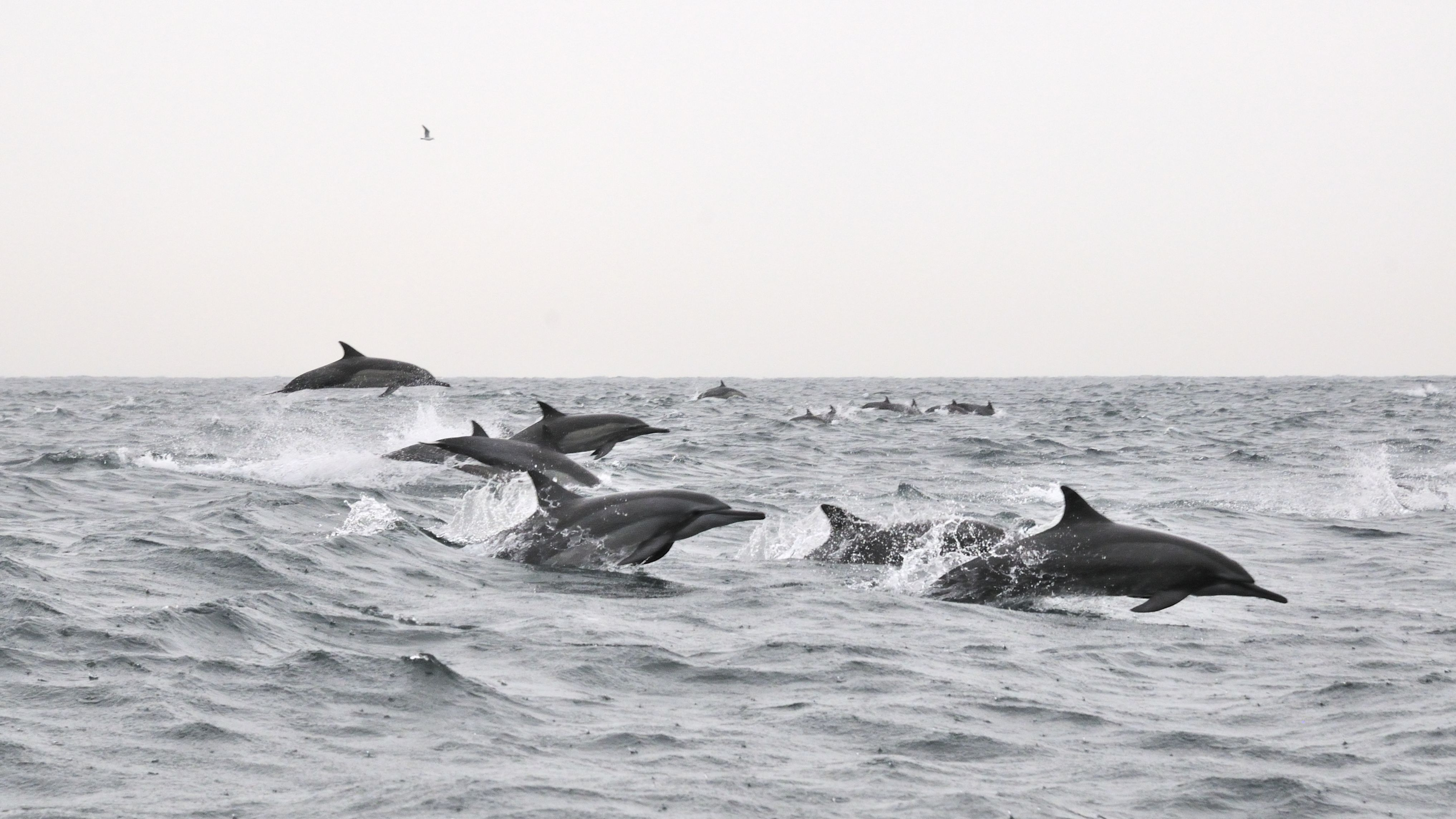
Spinner dolphins in Gulf of Oman

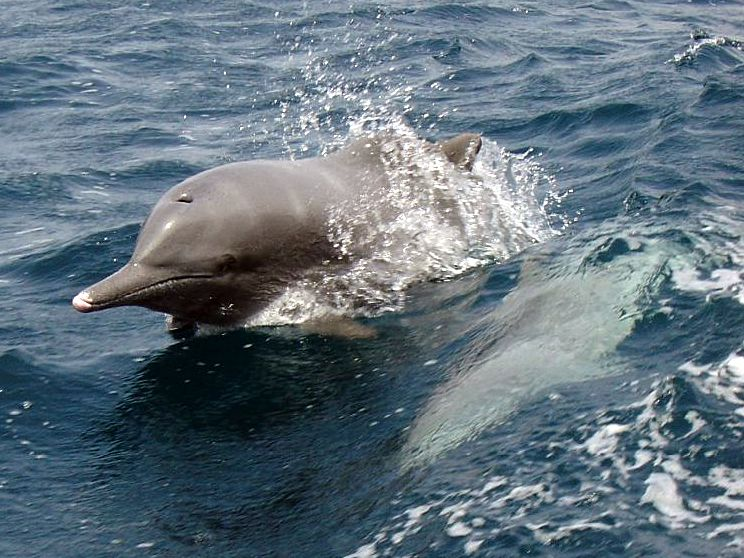
Indo-Pacific humpback dolphin off Khasab, Musandam

The order Cetacea includes whales, dolphins and porpoises. They are the mammals most fully adapted to aquatic life with a spindle-shaped nearly hairless body, protected by a thick layer of blubber, and forelimbs and tail modified to provide propulsion underwater.

- Suborder: Mysticeti
  - Family: Balaenidae
  - Family: Balaenopteridae
    - Subfamily: Balaenopterinae
      - Genus: Balaenoptera
        - Blue whale, Balaenoptera musculus EN
    - Subfamily: Megapterinae
      - Genus: Megaptera
        - Humpback whale, M. novaeangliae LC
- Suborder: Odontoceti
  - Superfamily: Platanistoidea
    - Family: Phocoenidae
      - Genus: Neophocaena
        - Indo-Pacific finless porpoise, Neophocaena phocaenoides DD
    - Family:Physeteridae
      - Genus: Physeter
        - Sperm whale, Physeter macrocephalus VU
    - Family: Kogiidae
      - Genus: Kogia
        - Pygmy sperm whale, K. breviceps DD
        - Dwarf sperm whale, Kogia sima LC
    - Family: Ziphidae
      - Subfamily: Hyperoodontinae
        - Genus: Mesoplodon
          - Blainville's beaked whale, Mesoplodon densirostris DD
    - Family: Delphinidae (marine dolphins)
      - Genus: Steno
        - Rough-toothed dolphin, Steno bredanensis DD
      - Genus: Sousa
        - Indian Ocean humpback dolphin, Sousa plumbea DD
      - Genus: Tursiops
        - Bottlenose dolphin, Tursiops aduncus DD
      - Genus: Stenella
        - Pantropical spotted dolphin, Stenella attenuata LC
        - Striped dolphin, Stenella coeruleoalba LC
        - Spinner dolphin, Stenella longirostris LC
      - Genus: Delphinus
        - Common dolphin, Delphinus capensis LC
      - Genus: Lagenodelphis
        - Fraser's dolphin, Lagenodelphis hosei DD
      - Genus: Grampus
        - Risso's dolphin, Grampus griseus DD
      - Genus: Feresa
        - Pygmy killer whale, Feresa attenuata DD
      - Genus: Pseudorca
        - False killer whale, Pseudorca crassidens LC
      - Genus: Orcinus
        - Orca, O. orca DD

== Order: Carnivora (carnivorans) ==
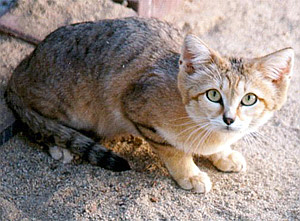
Sand cat

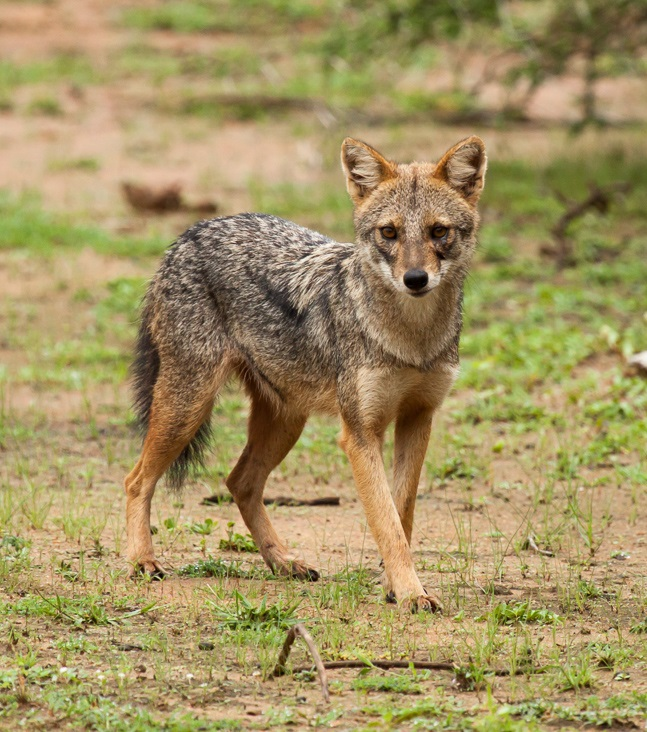
Golden jackal

There are over 260 species of carnivorans, the majority of which feed primarily on meat. They have a characteristic skull shape and dentition.

- Suborder: Feliformia
  - Family: Felidae (cats)
    - Subfamily: Felinae
      - Genus: Caracal
        - Caracal, C. caracal LC
      - Genus: Felis
        - African wildcat, F. lybica LC
        - Sand cat, F. margarita LC
    - Subfamily: Pantherinae
      - Genus: Panthera
        - Leopard, Panthera pardus VU
          - Arabian leopard, Panthera pardus nimr CR
  - Family: Viverridae
    - Subfamily: Viverrinae
      - Genus: Genetta
        - Common genet, G. genetta LC
  - Family: Herpestidae (mongooses)
    - Genus: Ichneumia
      - White-tailed mongoose, I. albacauda LC
  - Family: Hyaenidae (hyaenas)
    - Genus: Hyaena
      - Striped hyena, H. hyaena LC
- Suborder: Caniformia
  - Family: Canidae (dogs, foxes)
    - Genus: Vulpes
      - Blanford's fox, V. cana LC
      - Rüppell's fox, V. rueppellii LC
      - Red fox, V. vulpes LC
    - Genus: Canis
      - Golden jackal, C. aureus LC
      - Gray wolf, C. lupus LC
        - Arabian wolf, Canis lupus arabs
    - Family: Phocidae (earless seals)
      - Genus: Mirounga
        - Southern elephant seal, M. leonina LC vagrant
  - Family: Mustelidae (mustelids)
    - Genus: Mellivora
      - Honey badger, M. capensis LC

== Order: Artiodactyla (even-toed ungulates) ==
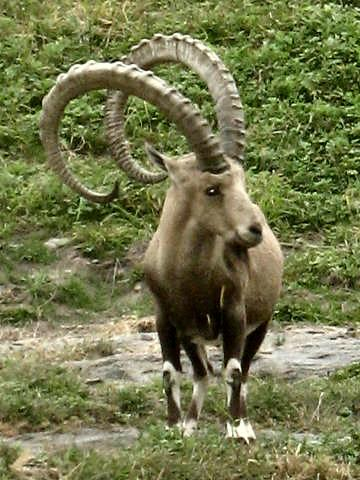
Nubian ibex

The even-toed ungulates are ungulates whose weight is borne about equally by the third and fourth toes, rather than mostly or entirely by the third as in perissodactyls. There are about 220 artiodactyl species, including many that are of great economic importance to humans.

- Family: Bovidae (cattle, antelope, sheep, goats)
  - Subfamily: Antilopinae
    - Genus: Gazella
      - Arabian gazelle, G. arabica VU
      - Arabian sand gazelle, G. marica VU
  - Subfamily: Caprinae
    - Genus: Arabitragus
      - Arabian tahr, A. jayakari EN
    - Genus: Capra
      - Nubian ibex, C. nubiana VU
    - Genus: Ovis
      - Urial, O. vignei VU presence uncertain, possibly introduced
        - Oman urial, O. v. arabica
  - Subfamily: Hippotraginae
    - Genus: Oryx
      - Arabian oryx, O. leucoryx VU reintroduced

== See also ==
- List of chordate orders
- Lists of mammals by region
- List of prehistoric mammals
- Mammal classification
- List of mammals described in the 2000s
