= List of mammals of Jordan =

There are 70 mammal species recorded in Jordan, of which two are endangered, ten are vulnerable, and three are near threatened.

The following tags are used to highlight each species' conservation status as assessed by the International Union for Conservation of Nature:

EX	Extinct	No reasonable doubt that the last individual has died.
EW	Extinct in the wild	Known only to survive in captivity or as a naturalized populations well outside its previous range.
CR	Critically endangered	The species is in imminent risk of extinction in the wild.
EN	Endangered	The species is facing an extremely high risk of extinction in the wild.
VU	Vulnerable	The species is facing a high risk of extinction in the wild.
NT	Near threatened	The species does not meet any of the criteria that would categorise it as risking extinction but it is likely to do so in the future.
LC	Least concern	There are no current identifiable risks to the species.
DD	Data deficient	There is inadequate information to make an assessment of the risks to this species.

== Order: Artiodactyla (even-toed ungulates) ==
The even-toed ungulates are ungulates whose weight is borne about equally by the third and fourth toes, rather than mostly or entirely by the third as in perissodactyls. There are about 220 artiodactyl species, including many that are of great economic importance to humans.

- Family: Bovidae (cattle, antelope, sheep, goats)
  - Subfamily: Antilopinae
    - Genus: Gazella
      - Dorcas gazelle, G. dorcas VU
      - Mountain gazelle, G. gazella EN
      - Arabian sand gazelle, G. marica VU
      - Goitered gazelle, G. subgutturosa VU
  - Subfamily: Caprinae
    - Genus: Capra
      - Nubian ibex, C. nubiana VU
  - Subfamily: Hippotraginae
    - Genus: Oryx
      - Arabian oryx, O. leucoryx VU reintroduced
- Family: Cervidae (deer)
  - Subfamily: Cervinae
    - Genus: Capreolus
      - Roe deer, C. capreolus LC
- Family: Suidae (pigs)
  - Genus: Sus
    - Wild boar, S. scrofa LC

== Order: Carnivora (carnivorans) ==
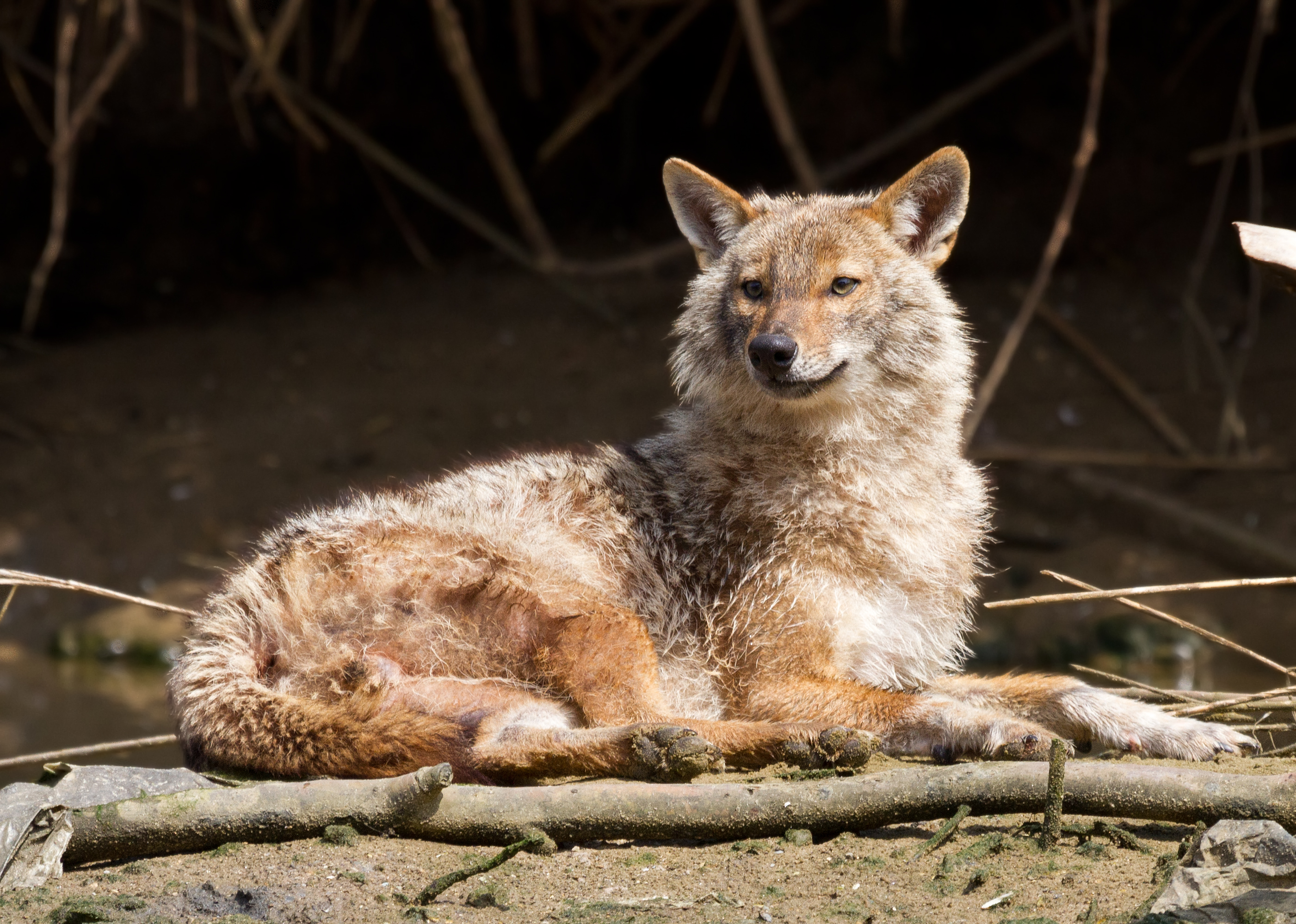
Syrian jackal

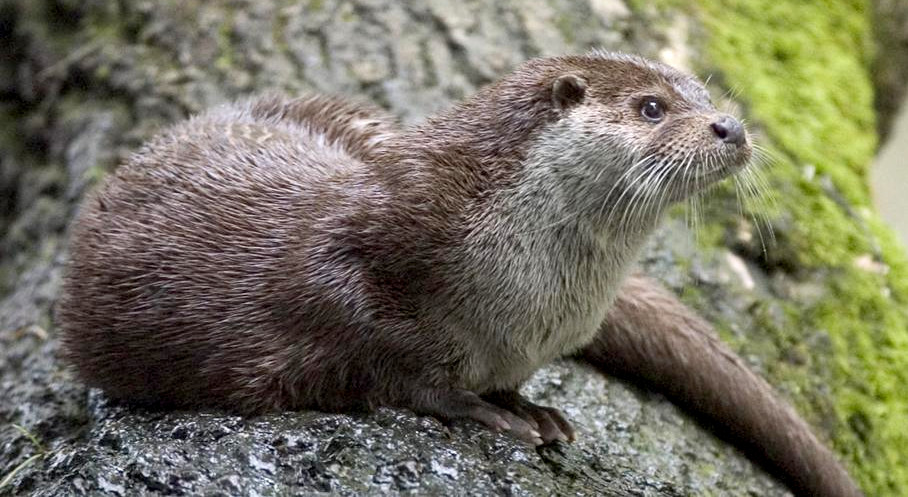
European otter

There are over 260 species of carnivorans, the majority of which feed primarily on meat. They have a characteristic skull shape and dentition.

- Suborder: Feliformia
  - Family: Felidae (cats)
    - Subfamily: Felinae
      - Genus: Caracal
        - Caracal, C. caracal LC
      - Genus: Felis
        - Jungle cat, F. chaus LC
        - African wildcat, F. lybica LC
        - Sand cat, F. margarita LC
  - Family: Herpestidae (mongooses)
    - Genus: Herpestes
      - Egyptian mongoose, H. ichneumon LC
    - Genus: Urva
      - Small Indian mongoose, U. auropunctata LC
  - Family: Hyaenidae (hyenas)
    - Genus: Hyaena
      - Striped hyena, H. hyaena NT
- Suborder: Caniformia
  - Family: Canidae (dogs, foxes)
    - Genus: Canis
      - Golden jackal, C. aureus LC
        - Persian jackal, C. a. aureus
        - Syrian jackal, C. a. syriacus
      - Gray wolf, C. lupus LC
        - Arabian wolf, C. l. arabs
    - Genus: Vulpes
      - Blanford's fox, V. cana LC
      - Rüppell's fox, V. rueppellii LC
      - Red fox, V. vulpes LC
  - Family: Mustelidae (mustelids)
    - Genus: Lutra
      - Eurasian otter, L. lutra NT
    - Genus: Meles
      - Caucasian badger, M. canescens NE
    - Genus: Mellivora
      - Honey badger, M. capensis LC

== Order: Cetacea (whales) ==
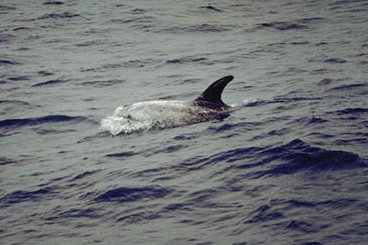
Risso's dolphin

The order Cetacea includes whales, dolphins and porpoises. They are the mammals most fully adapted to aquatic life with a spindle-shaped nearly hairless body, protected by a thick layer of blubber, and forelimbs and tail modified to provide propulsion underwater.

- Suborder: Mysticeti
  - Family: Balaenopteridae
    - Subfamily: Balaenopterinae
      - Genus: Balaenoptera
        - Bryde's whale, B. edeni LC
    - Subfamily: Megapterinae
      - Genus: Megaptera
        - Humpback whale, M. novaeangliae LC
- Suborder: Odontoceti
  - Superfamily: Platanistoidea
    - Family: Delphinidae (marine dolphins)
      - Genus: Grampus
        - Risso's dolphin, G. griseus LC
      - Genus: Pseudorca
        - False killer whale, P. crassidens EN
      - Genus: Stenella
        - Pantropical spotted dolphin, S. attenuata LC
        - Spinner dolphin, S. longirostris LC
      - Genus: Tursiops
        - Common bottlenose dolphin, T. truncatus LC
        - Indo-Pacific bottlenose dolphin, T. aduncus NT

== Order: Chiroptera (bats) ==
The bats' most distinguishing feature is that their forelimbs are developed as wings, making them the only mammals capable of flight. Bat species account for about 20% of all mammals.

- Family: Pteropodidae (flying foxes, Old World fruit bats)
  - Subfamily: Pteropodinae
    - Genus: Rousettus
      - Egyptian fruit bat, R. aegyptiacus LC
- Family: Vespertilionidae
  - Subfamily: Myotinae
    - Genus: Myotis
      - Lesser mouse-eared bat, M. blythii LC
      - Long-fingered bat, M. capaccinii VU
      - Geoffroy's bat, M. emarginatus LC
      - Greater mouse-eared bat, M. myotis LC
      - Natterer's bat, M. nattereri LC
  - Subfamily: Vespertilioninae
    - Genus: Eptesicus
      - Botta's serotine, E. bottae LC
    - Genus: Hypsugo
      - Desert pipistrelle, H. ariel DD
    - Genus: Otonycteris
      - Desert long-eared bat, O. hemprichii LC
    - Genus: Pipistrellus
      - Kuhl's pipistrelle, P. kuhlii LC
    - Genus: Plecotus
      - Grey long-eared bat, P. austriacus LC
  - Subfamily: Miniopterinae
    - Genus: Miniopterus
      - Common bent-wing bat, M. schreibersii VU
- Family: Rhinopomatidae
  - Genus: Rhinopoma
    - Egyptian mouse-tailed bat, R. cystops LC
    - Lesser mouse-tailed bat, R. hardwickei LC
    - Greater mouse-tailed bat, R. microphyllum LC
- Family: Molossidae
  - Genus: Tadarida
    - European free-tailed bat, T. teniotis LC
- Family: Emballonuridae
  - Genus: Taphozous
    - Naked-rumped tomb bat, T. nudiventris LC
- Family: Nycteridae
  - Genus: Nycteris
    - Egyptian slit-faced bat, N. thebaica LC
- Family: Rhinolophidae
  - Subfamily: Rhinolophinae
    - Genus: Rhinolophus
      - Blasius's horseshoe bat, R. blasii LC
      - Geoffroy's horseshoe bat, R. clivosus LC
      - Mediterranean horseshoe bat, R. euryale NT
      - Greater horseshoe bat, R. ferrumequinum LC
      - Lesser horseshoe bat, R. hipposideros LC

== Order: Erinaceomorpha (hedgehogs and gymnures) ==
The order Erinaceomorpha contains a single family, Erinaceidae, which comprise the hedgehogs and gymnures. The hedgehogs are easily recognised by their spines while gymnures look more like large rats.

- Family: Erinaceidae (hedgehogs)
  - Subfamily: Erinaceinae
    - Genus: Paraechinus
      - Desert hedgehog, P. aethiopicus LC

== Order: Hyracoidea (hyraxes) ==
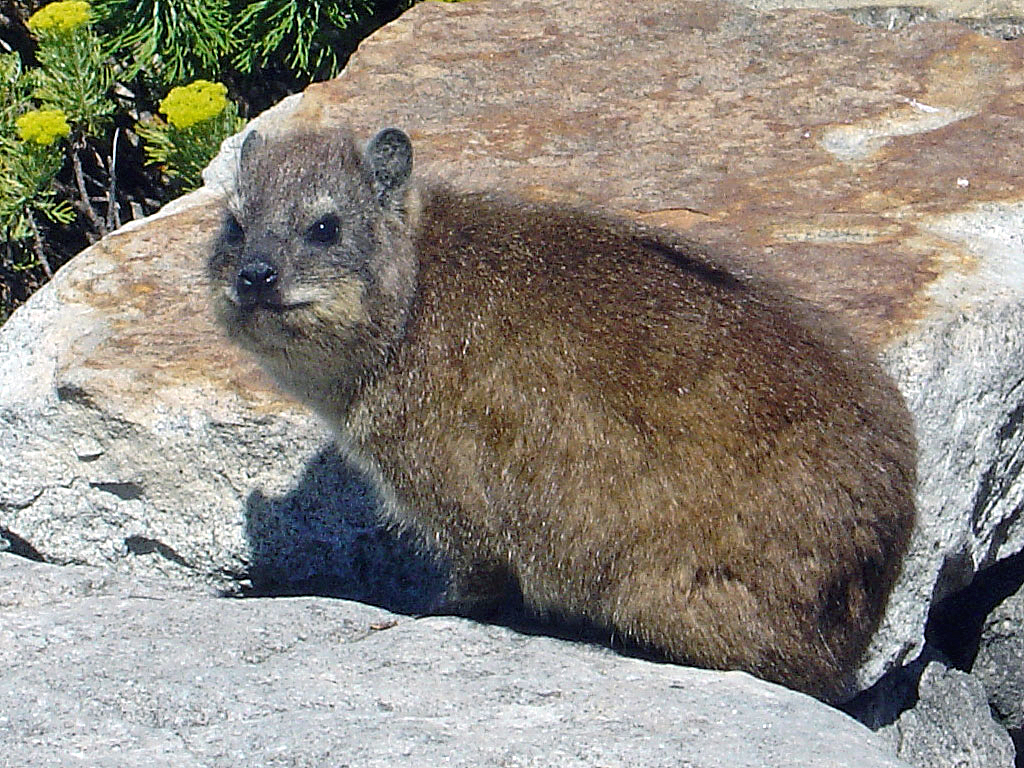
Cape hyrax

The hyraxes are any of four species of fairly small, thickset, herbivorous mammals in the order Hyracoidea. About the size of a domestic cat, they are well-furred, with rounded bodies and a stumpy tail. They are native to Africa and the Middle East.

- Family: Procaviidae (hyraxes)
  - Genus: Procavia
    - Cape hyrax, P. capensis LC

== Order: Lagomorpha (lagomorphs) ==
The lagomorphs comprise two families, Leporidae (hares and rabbits), and Ochotonidae (pikas). Though they can resemble rodents, and were classified as a superfamily in that order until the early 20th century, they have since been considered a separate order. They differ from rodents in a number of physical characteristics, such as having four incisors in the upper jaw rather than two.

- Family: Leporidae (rabbits, hares)
  - Genus: Lepus
    - Cape hare, L. capensis LC

== Order: Rodentia (rodents) ==
Rodents make up the largest order of mammals, with over 40% of mammalian species. They have two incisors in the upper and lower jaw which grow continually and must be kept short by gnawing. Most rodents are small though the capybara can weigh up to 45 kg (99 lb).

- Suborder: Hystricognathi
  - Family: Hystricidae (Old World porcupines)
    - Genus: Hystrix
      - Indian crested porcupine, H. indica LC
- Suborder: Sciurognathi
  - Family: Sciuridae (squirrels)
    - Subfamily: Sciurinae
      - Tribe: Sciurini
        - Genus: Sciurus
          - Caucasian squirrel, S. anomalus LC
  - Family: Gliridae (dormice)
    - Subfamily: Leithiinae
      - Genus: Eliomys
        - Asian garden dormouse, E. melanurus LC
  - Family: Dipodidae (jerboas)
    - Subfamily: Allactaginae
      - Genus: Allactaga
        - Euphrates jerboa, A. euphratica NT
  - Family: Spalacidae
    - Subfamily: Spalacinae
      - Genus: Nannospalax
        - Palestine mole rat, N. ehrenbergi LC
  - Family: Cricetidae (hamsters, voles, lemmings etc.)
    - Subfamily: Cricetinae
      - Genus: Cricetulus
        - Grey dwarf hamster, C. migratorius NT
    - Subfamily: Arvicolinae
      - Genus: Microtus
        - Günther's vole, M. guentheri LC
  - Family: Muridae (mice, rats, gerbils, jirds etc.)
    - Subfamily: Deomyinae
      - Genus: Acomys
        - Cairo spiny mouse, A. cahirinus LC
        - Golden spiny mouse, A. russatus LC
    - Subfamily: Gerbillinae
      - Genus: Gerbillus
        - Anderson's gerbil, G. andersoni LC
        - Wagner's gerbil, G. dasyurus LC
        - Pygmy gerbil, G. henleyi LC
        - Balochistan gerbil, G. nanus LC
      - Genus: Meriones
        - Sundevall's jird, M. crassus LC
        - Libyan jird, M. libycus LC
        - Tristram's jird, M. tristrami LC
      - Genus: Psammomys
        - Sand rat, P. obesus LC
      - Genus: Sekeetamys
        - Bushy-tailed jird, S. calurus LC
    - Subfamily: Murinae
      - Genus: Apodemus
        - Broad-toothed field mouse, A. mystacinus LC
      - Genus: Mus
        - Macedonian mouse, M. macedonicus LC

== Order: Sirenia (manatees and dugongs) ==
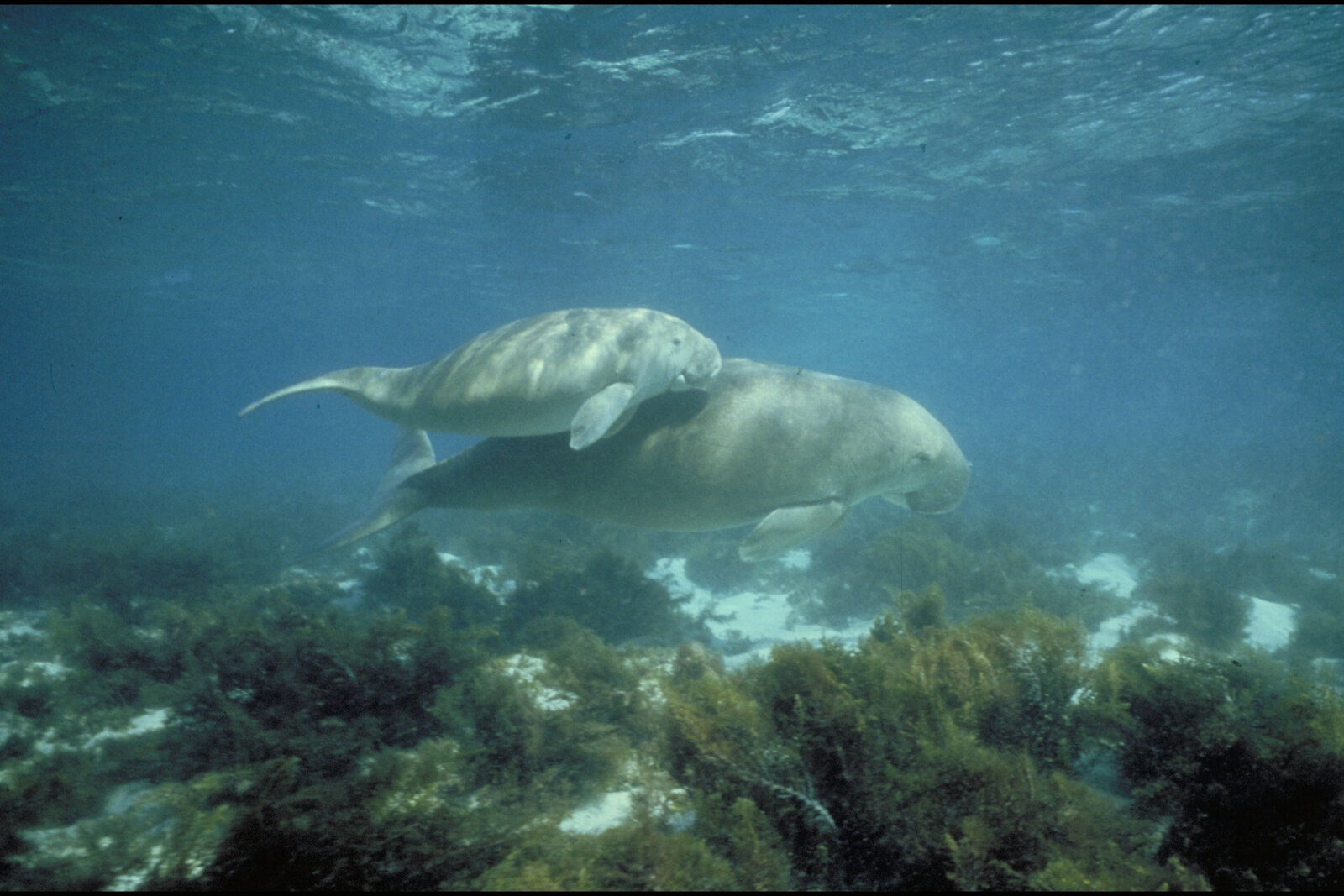
Dugongs

Sirenia is an order of fully aquatic, herbivorous mammals that inhabit rivers, estuaries, coastal marine waters, swamps, and marine wetlands. All four species are endangered.

- Family: Dugongidae
  - Genus: Dugong
    - Dugong, D. dugon VU

== Order: Soricomorpha (shrews, moles, and solenodons) ==
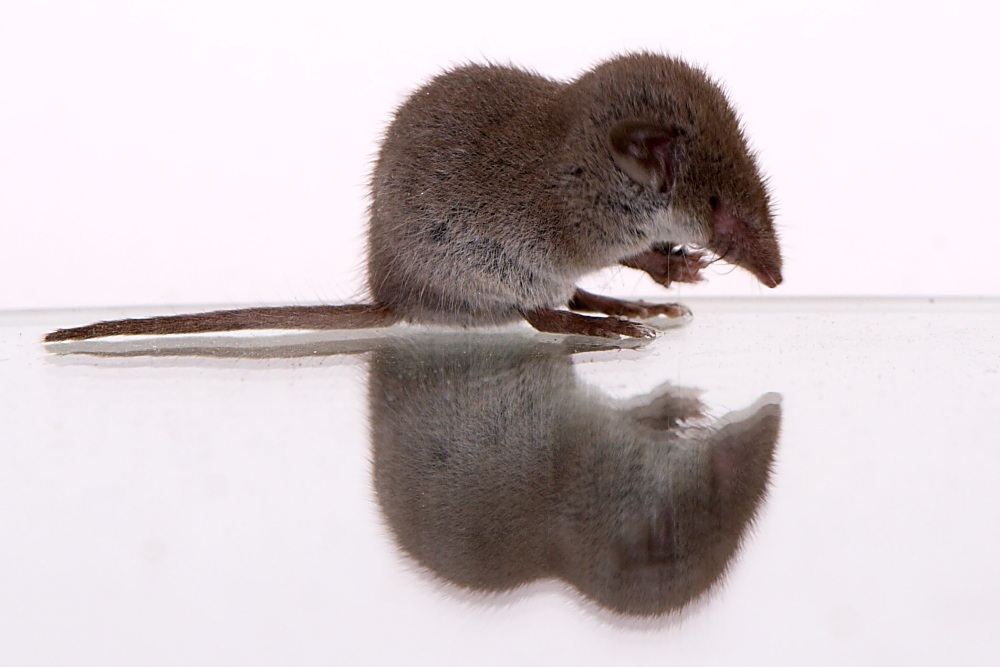
Lesser white-toothed shrew

The "shrew-forms" are insectivorous mammals. The shrews and solenodons closely resemble mice while the moles are stout-bodied burrowers.

- Family: Soricidae (shrews)
  - Subfamily: Crocidurinae
    - Genus: Crocidura
      - Lesser white-toothed shrew, C. suaveolens LC

== Locally extinct ==
The following species are locally extinct in the country:

- Cheetah, Acinonyx jubatus
- Hartebeest, Alcelaphus buselaphus
- Wild goat, Capra aegagrus
- Red deer, Cervus elaphus
- Persian fallow deer, Dama mesopotamica
- Onager, Equus hemionus
- Lion, Panthera leo
- Leopard, Panthera pardus
- Brown bear, Ursus arctos

== See also ==
- Wildlife of Jordan
- List of chordate orders
- Lists of mammals by region
- Mammal classification
