= Yemeni mouse-tailed bat =

Conservation status
- Endangered (IUCN 3.1)

Scientific classification
- Kingdom: Animalia
- Phylum: Chordata
- Class: Mammalia
- Order: Chiroptera
- Family: Rhinopomatidae
- Genus: Rhinopoma
- Species: R. hadramauticum

Binomial name
- Rhinopoma hadramauticum Benda, Reiter, Al-Jumaily, Nasher & Hulva, 2009

Species of bat

The Yemeni mouse-tailed bat (Rhinopoma hadramauticum) is an endangered species of bat found in Yemen. It is only known from one roost, and its population is estimated at 150 individuals.

== Taxonomy and etymology ==
Before 2001, it was believed that only one mouse-tailed bat species was found in Yemen—the lesser mouse-tailed bat, Rhinopoma hardwickii. In 2001, a paper was published that cited the presence of the small mouse-tailed bat, R. muscatellum, in the Hadramaut Province of Yemen. However, an analysis of mitochondrial DNA in 2007 found a "deep genetic gap" between R. muscatellum in Iran and the individuals identified as R. muscatellum in Yemen. The genetic distance for the two populations was 8–9%. The lineages of the two populations are estimated to have diverged 10 million years ago. The 2007 study concluded that the population discovered in Yemen in 2001 was a distinct clade within R. muscatellum, but the authors stopped short of describing it as a new species. The Yemeni population of R. muscatellum was described as a new species in 2009 based on the genetic difference described in the 2007 paper. Its species name hadramauticum is a Neo-Latin derivation of "Hadramaut", which is the place where the holotype was collected.

== Description ==
It is considered a medium-sized bat for its genus. It has a nose-leaf that is trapezoidal in shape. Its tragus is broad and blunt, with two points. The outside edge of each tragus has several emarginations. Fur on the dorsal and ventral surfaces is grayish to grayish-brown in color. Fur around the neck is yellowish-brown, creating the appearance of a collar. The skin of its face, ears, belly, and extremities is pale gray in color. Its wing membranes, fingers, tail, and the tips of its ears are gray. Its forearm is 52–55.7 mm (2.05–2.19 in) long; its tail is 54–62 mm (2.1–2.4 in) long;

== Range and habitat ==
The only known colony of this species, as of 2007, was in a newly-constructed and uninhabited house in the village of Ash Shahar. The elevation of this roost is 65 m (213 ft) above sea level. The habitat around the roost, where the bat presumably forages, consists of arid and semi-desert climate.

== Conservation ==
It is currently evaluated as endangered by the IUCN. It meets the criteria for this designation because it is known from only one site, and its total population is estimated at 150 individuals. Main threats to this species are disturbances to its only known roost site. In the same paper where the species was initially described, the authors stated that it "may rank among the most threatened bat species in the Middle East or even in the World."
