= Macinnes's mouse-tailed bat =

Conservation status
- Data Deficient (IUCN 3.1)

Scientific classification
- Kingdom: Animalia
- Phylum: Chordata
- Class: Mammalia
- Order: Chiroptera
- Family: Rhinopomatidae
- Genus: Rhinopoma
- Species: R. macinnesi

Binomial name
- Rhinopoma macinnesi Hayman, 1937

Species of bat

The Macinnes's mouse-tailed bat (Rhinopoma macinnesi) is a species of bat in the Rhinopomatidae family. It is found in Ethiopia, Kenya, Somalia, and Uganda. Its natural habitats are subtropical or tropical dry shrubland, and hot and temperate deserts.
