= Egyptian mouse-tailed bat =

Conservation status
- Least Concern (IUCN 3.1)

Scientific classification
- Kingdom: Animalia
- Phylum: Chordata
- Class: Mammalia
- Infraclass: Placentalia
- Order: Chiroptera
- Family: Rhinopomatidae
- Genus: Rhinopoma
- Species: R. cystops

Binomial name
- Rhinopoma cystops Thomas, 1903

Synonyms
- Rhinopoma hardwickii cystops Thomas, 1903

Species of bat

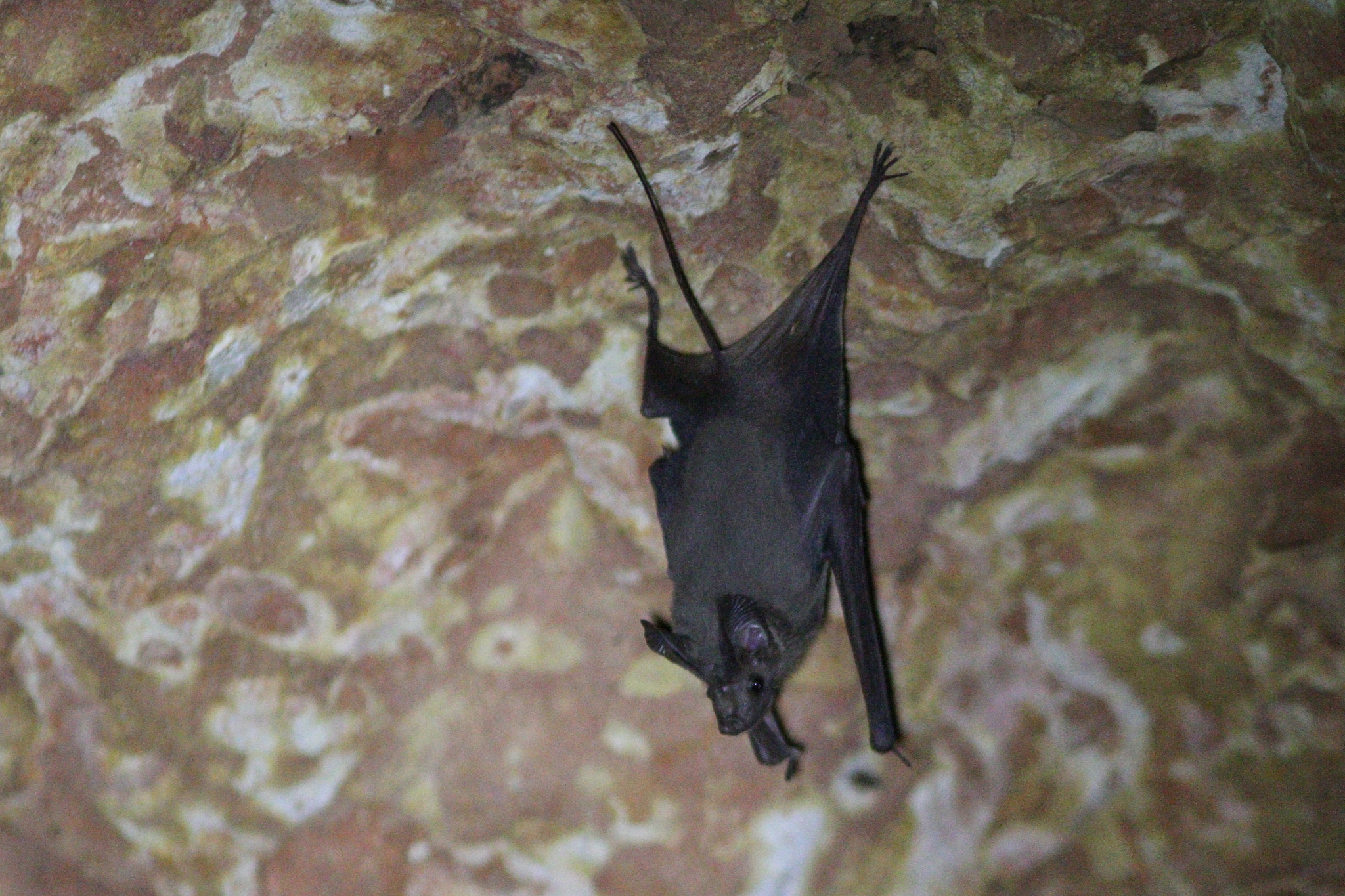
Egyptian Mouse-tailed Bat in Kédougou, Senegal

The Egyptian mouse-tailed bat (Rhinopoma cystops) is a species of mouse-tailed bat found in North Africa and the Middle East.

== Taxonomy ==
It was described as a new species in 1903 by British zoologist Oldfield Thomas. The holotype had been collected near Luxor, Egypt by Charles Rothschild. It was long considered a subspecies of the lesser mouse-tailed bat, R. hardwickii, but in 2007, Hulva et al. published that it should be considered a full species.

== Description ==
It has a dental formula of 1.1.1.32.1.2.3 for a total of 28 teeth.

== Biology and ecology ==
It is a colonial species, forming aggregations consisting of a few individuals or as many as one thousand. It utilizes both caves and human structures as roosts.

== Range and habitat ==
Its range includes several countries and regions in North Africa and the Middle East: Algeria, Burkina Faso, Cameroon, Djibouti, Egypt, Eritrea, Ethiopia, Israel, Jordan, Libya, Mali, Mauritania, Morocco, Niger, Nigeria, Oman, Saudi Arabia, Senegal, Somalia, South Sudan, Sudan, Syria, Tunisia, Western Sahara, and Yemen. It has been documented at elevations up to 1,100 m (3,600 ft) above sea level.

== Conservation ==
As of 2017, it is evaluated as a least-concern species by the IUCN. It meets the criteria for this classification because it has a wide geographic range and no major threats to its existence are known.
