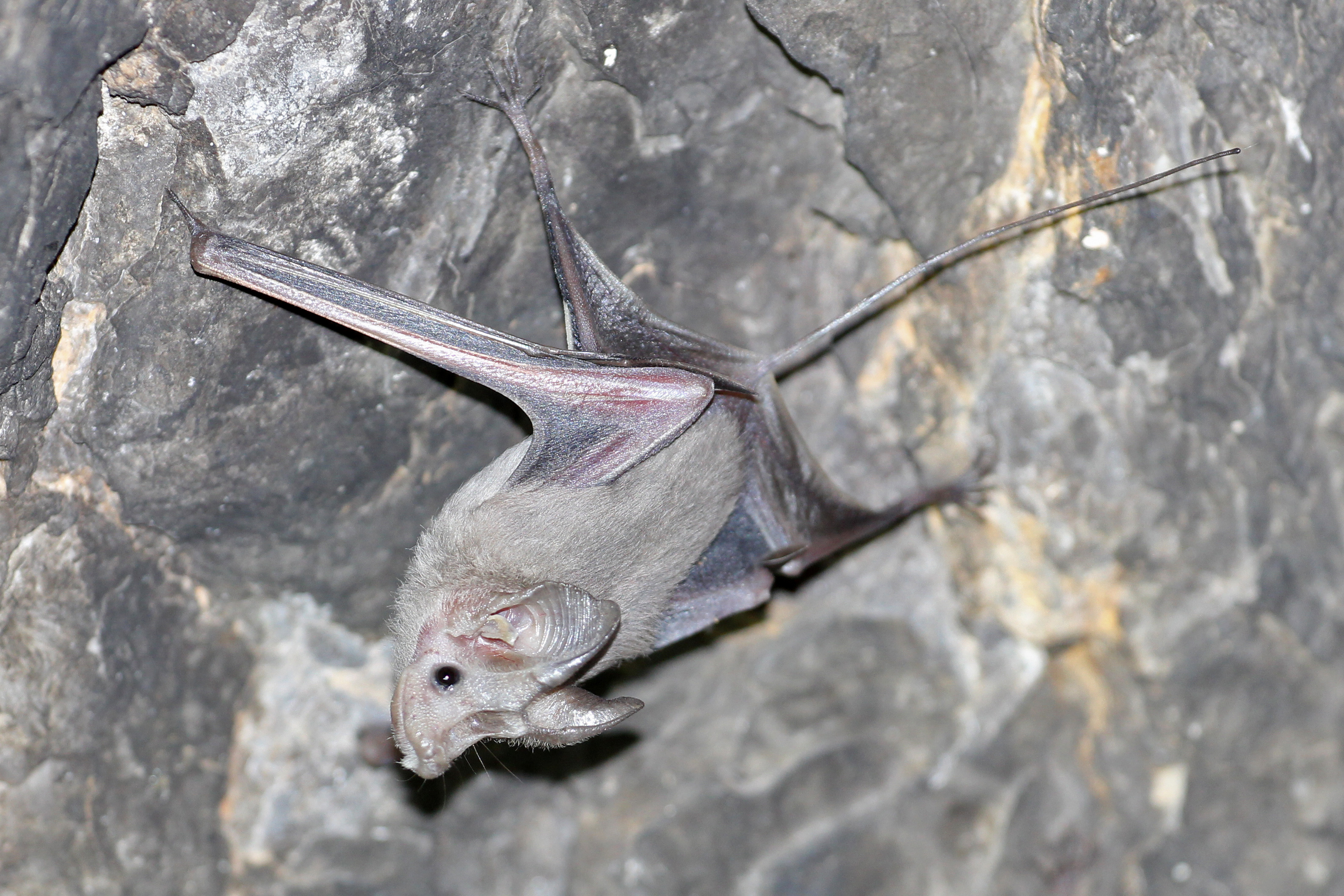

Conservation status
- Least Concern (IUCN 3.1)

Scientific classification
- Kingdom: Animalia
- Phylum: Chordata
- Class: Mammalia
- Order: Chiroptera
- Family: Rhinopomatidae
- Genus: Rhinopoma
- Species: R. muscatellum

Binomial name
- Rhinopoma muscatellum Thomas, 1903
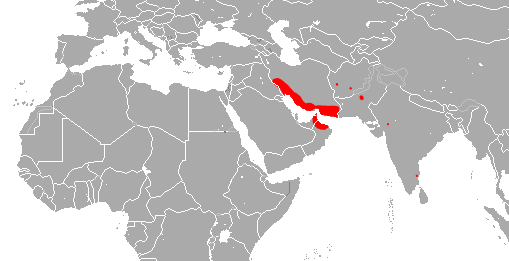
- Small mouse-tailed bat range

= Small mouse-tailed bat =

Species of bat

The small mouse-tailed bat (Rhinopoma muscatellum) is a species of bat in the Rhinopomatidae family. It is found in Afghanistan, Iran, Oman, United Arab Emirates and possibly Ethiopia, ranging from the Sistan Basin in Iran well into the Helmand River basin of south-western Afghanistan.

Small mouse tailed bats have a wingspan of 17–25 cm (6.7–9.8 in), a body length of 6–8 cm (2.4–3.1 in) and a tail the same length as its body. Their diet consists of flying insects which they eat whilst flying.

This species was demonstrated as distinct from R. hardwickei based on mutually exclusive morphological features; the small mouse-tailed bat has a nearly unridged skull with small teeth and large cavities filled with fluid.

Distance to roads-railways, annual mean temperature, elevation, and distance to the ridge were significant for the small mouse-tailed bat.
