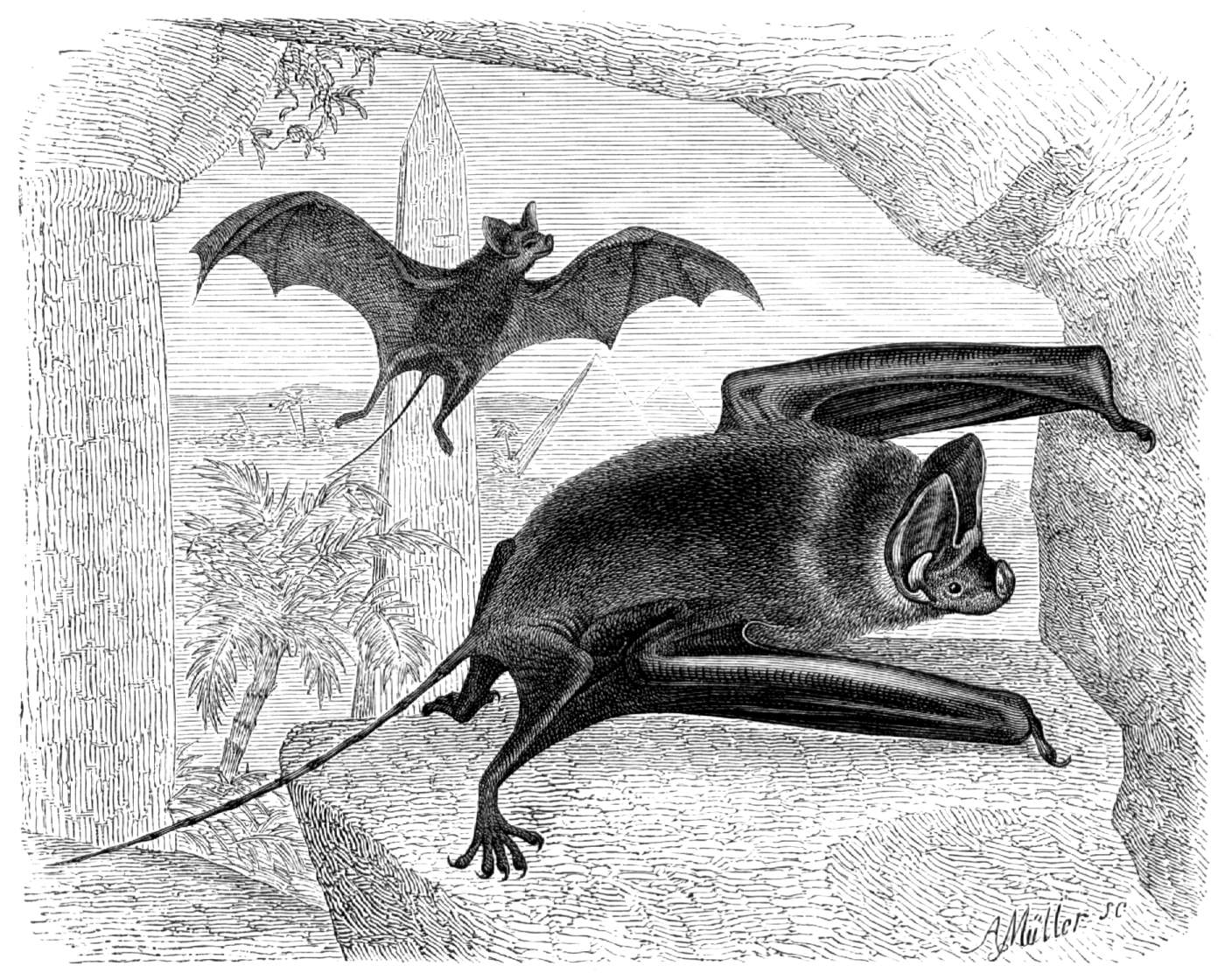
- Greater mouse-tailed bat (Rhinopoma microphyllum)

Scientific classification
- Kingdom: Animalia
- Phylum: Chordata
- Class: Mammalia
- Order: Chiroptera
- Family: Rhinopomatidae; Bonaparte 1838
- Genus: Rhinopoma; Geoffroy 1818

Type species
- Vespertilio microphyllus Brünnich, 1782

Species
- R. cystops R. hadramauticum R. hardwickei R. macinnesi R. microphyllum R. muscatellum
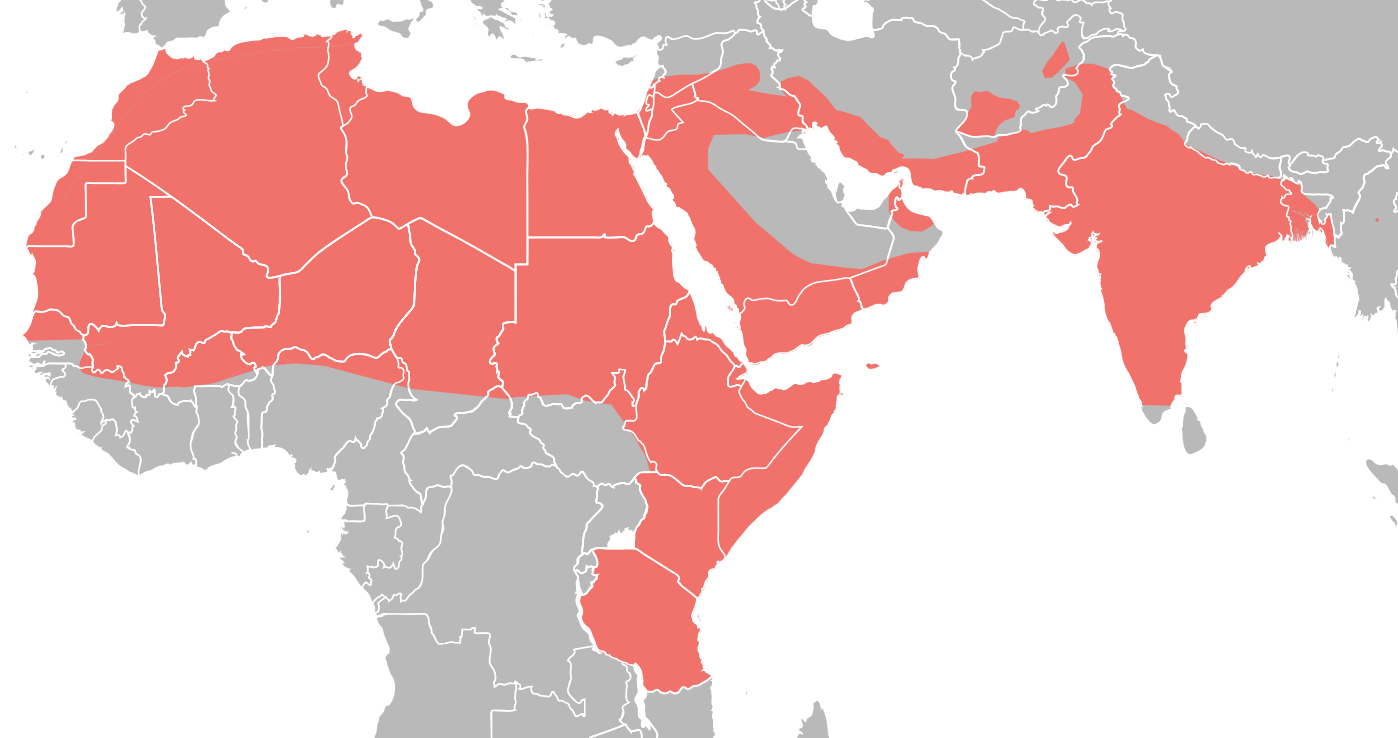
- Rhinopomatidae distribution

= Mouse-tailed bat =

Mouse-tailed bats

Genus of bats

Mouse-tailed bats are a group of insectivorous microbats of the family Rhinopomatidae with only three to six species, all contained in the single genus Rhinopoma. They are found in the Old World, from North Africa to Thailand and Sumatra, in arid and semiarid regions, roosting in caves, houses and even the Egyptian pyramids. They are relatively small, with a body length of just 5 to 6 cm. They weigh between 6 and 14 g.

== Features ==
Rhinopomatidae are small bats with very slim limbs and a long, thin, hairless tail, which is nearly the same length as the rest of the body and not connected to the patagium. Their sand-colored coat is soft and short. The snout has a small and simple nose leaf with valvular nostrils. Their big ears have a well-developed tragus and are connected to their big, black eyes by a band of skin across the forehead. There is a fat repository located near the caudal peduncle and the hind legs. Of all the bats, Rhinopomatidae have the shortest fingers relative to their forearm-length. They have a head-body length of 50 to 90 mm, forearm-length of 45 to 75 mm, a tail-length of 40 to 80 mm and a body weight of 6 to 14 grams.

== Lifestyle ==
Rhinopomatidae live in deserts and semi-arid climates in North Africa and South Asia, from Morocco and Senegal to South Sudan, the Middle East and India to Myanmar, Thailand, and North-Sumatra. They also come to agricultural areas and disturbed areas. They are adaptable and live along walls with low humidity and high temperatures. They also use crevices, rock walls, houses, tombs (including the Egyptian Pyramids, where they have been coming for more than three-thousand years), tunnels and caves as shelters. Animals from the more northern parts of South-Asia travel to winter colonies, where they become torpid, although they do not truly hibernate. In very dry periods during a food shortage they estivate, where they live on their fat stores.

Rhinopomatidae live in colonies of thousands, where they gather in small, scattered groups. Mixed groups are common but groups with only males or females also occur. They live in roosts of a thousand or more members, and have one or two young per year. They have poor flight endurance and fast fliers quickly become exhausted. They can also quickly run on the ground. They hunt small insects including beetles that have flight altitudes of five to ten meters.

== Classification ==
This family is closely related to Kitti's hog-nosed bat, complementing the Rhinopomatidae in the superfamily Rhinopomatoidea. They are also closely related to horseshoe bats, Old World leaf-nosed bats and pteropodids, the other members of the suborder Yinpterochiroptera. There are four species that appear in the drier areas of North Africa and in southern Asia. There are two known fossil genera, Corbarhina from the Miocene of France and Qarunycteris from the Eocene of Egypt.

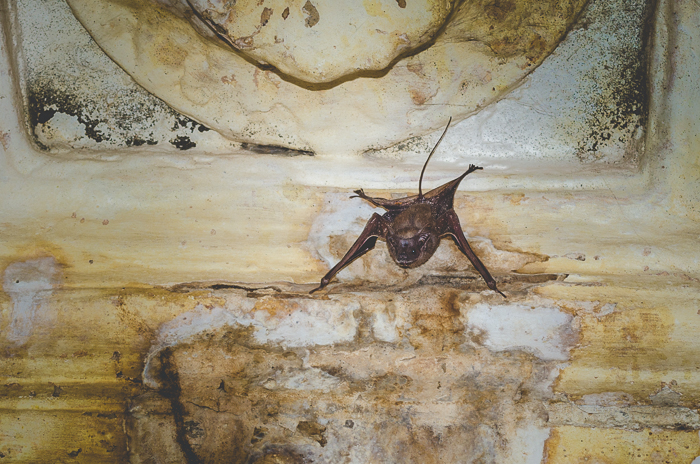
Mouse-tailed bat

The following species are assigned to Rhinopoma:

- R. hardwickii Gray, 1831
- R. cystops Thomas, 1903
- R. hadramauticum Benda et al. 2009
- R. macinnesi Hayman, 1937
- R. microphyllum (Brünnich, 1782)
- R. muscatellum Thomas, 1903
