= Desert pipistrelle =

Conservation status
- Data Deficient (IUCN 3.1)

Scientific classification
- Kingdom: Animalia
- Phylum: Chordata
- Class: Mammalia
- Order: Chiroptera
- Family: Vespertilionidae
- Genus: Hypsugo
- Species: H. ariel

Binomial name
- Hypsugo ariel (Thomas, 1904)

Synonyms
- Pipistrellus ariel Thomas, 1904; Pipistrellus bodenheimeri Harrison, 1960

Species of bat

The desert pipistrelle (Hypsugo ariel) is a species of vesper bat in the genus Hypsugo. It is found in Egypt, Israel, Jordan, Oman, Saudi Arabia, Sudan, and Yemen. Its natural habitats are subtropical or tropical dry shrubland, rocky areas, and hot deserts.
