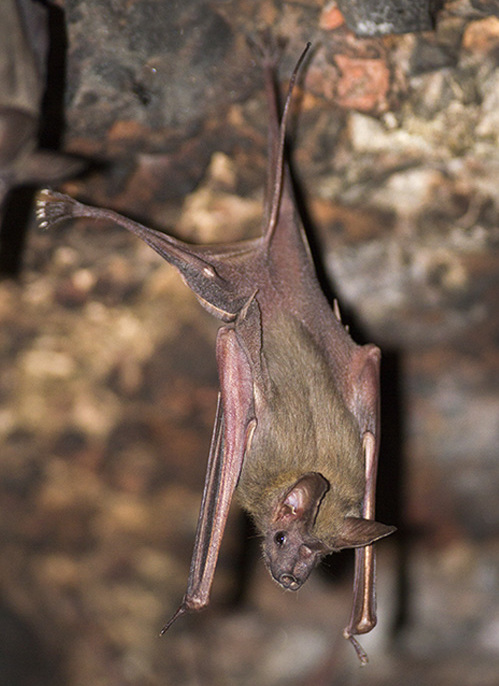

Conservation status
- Least Concern (IUCN 3.1)

Scientific classification
- Kingdom: Animalia
- Phylum: Chordata
- Class: Mammalia
- Order: Chiroptera
- Family: Rhinopomatidae
- Genus: Rhinopoma
- Species: R. microphyllum

Binomial name
- Rhinopoma microphyllum (Brünnich, 1782)
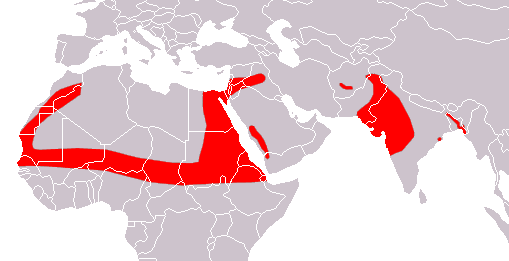
- Greater mouse-tailed bat range

= Greater mouse-tailed bat =

Species of bat

The greater mouse-tailed bat (Rhinopoma microphyllum) is a species of bat in the Rhinopomatidae family.

== Range and habitat ==
It is found in Algeria, Bangladesh, Burkina Faso, the Central African Republic, Chad, Djibouti, Egypt, Eritrea, Ethiopia, India, Indonesia, Iran, Israel, Iraq, Jordan, Libya, Mali, Mauritania, Morocco, Myanmar, Niger, Nigeria, Oman, Pakistan, Saudi Arabia, Senegal, Sudan, Thailand, Tunisia, Western Sahara, and Yemen. Its natural habitat is subtropical or tropical dry shrubland.

== Biology and ecology ==
According to a recent research published in Royal Society of London, the greater mouse-tailed bat hibernates at the unusually warm and constant temperature of 68 °F in caves in Israel's Great Rift Valley. From October to February, these bats were discovered semi-conscious, breathing only once every 15–30 minutes, with extremely low energy expenditures.

Rhinopoma microphyllum eats exclusively insects. A study on its diet revealed that the species is primarily a Coleoptera feeder in both maternity and summer quarters, although a more diverse feeding habit is found in the summer roosts. Other prey types include Diptera, Neuroptera and Hymenoptera. They mate at the beginning of spring.

== Systematics ==
The species was described by Brünnich in 1782 as Vespertillio microphyllus based on a specimen collected by P. Forsskål at the Giza pyramids, Egypt, on the Danish Arabia Expedition 1761-67 and brought into the collections of the Zoological Museum of Copenhagen by Carsten Niebuhr, the leader of the expedition.
