= Petter's soft-furred mouse =

Conservation status
- Least Concern (IUCN 3.1)

Scientific classification
- Kingdom: Animalia
- Phylum: Chordata
- Class: Mammalia
- Order: Rodentia
- Family: Muridae
- Genus: Praomys
- Species: P. petteri

Binomial name
- Praomys petteri Van der Straeten, Lecompte & Denys, 2003

Species of rodent

Petter's soft-furred mouse, or Petter's praomys (Praomys petteri) is a species of rodent in the family Muridae. It is found in Cameroon, Central African Republic, and Republic of the Congo. Its natural habitat is subtropical or tropical moist lowland forests.

== Sources ==
- Musser, G. G.; Carleton, M. D. (2005). "Superfamily Muroidea". In Wilson, D. E.; Reeder, D. M. (eds.). Mammal Species of the World: A Taxonomic and Geographic Reference (3rd ed.). Johns Hopkins University Press. pp. 894–1531. ISBN 978-0-8018-8221-0. OCLC 62265494.
