= Praomys coetzeei =

Scientific classification
- Kingdom: Animalia
- Phylum: Chordata
- Class: Mammalia
- Order: Rodentia
- Family: Muridae
- Genus: Praomys
- Species: P. coetzeei

Binomial name
- Praomys coetzeei Van der Straeten, 2008

Species of rodent

Praomys coetzeei is a species of mouse in the family Muridae.
