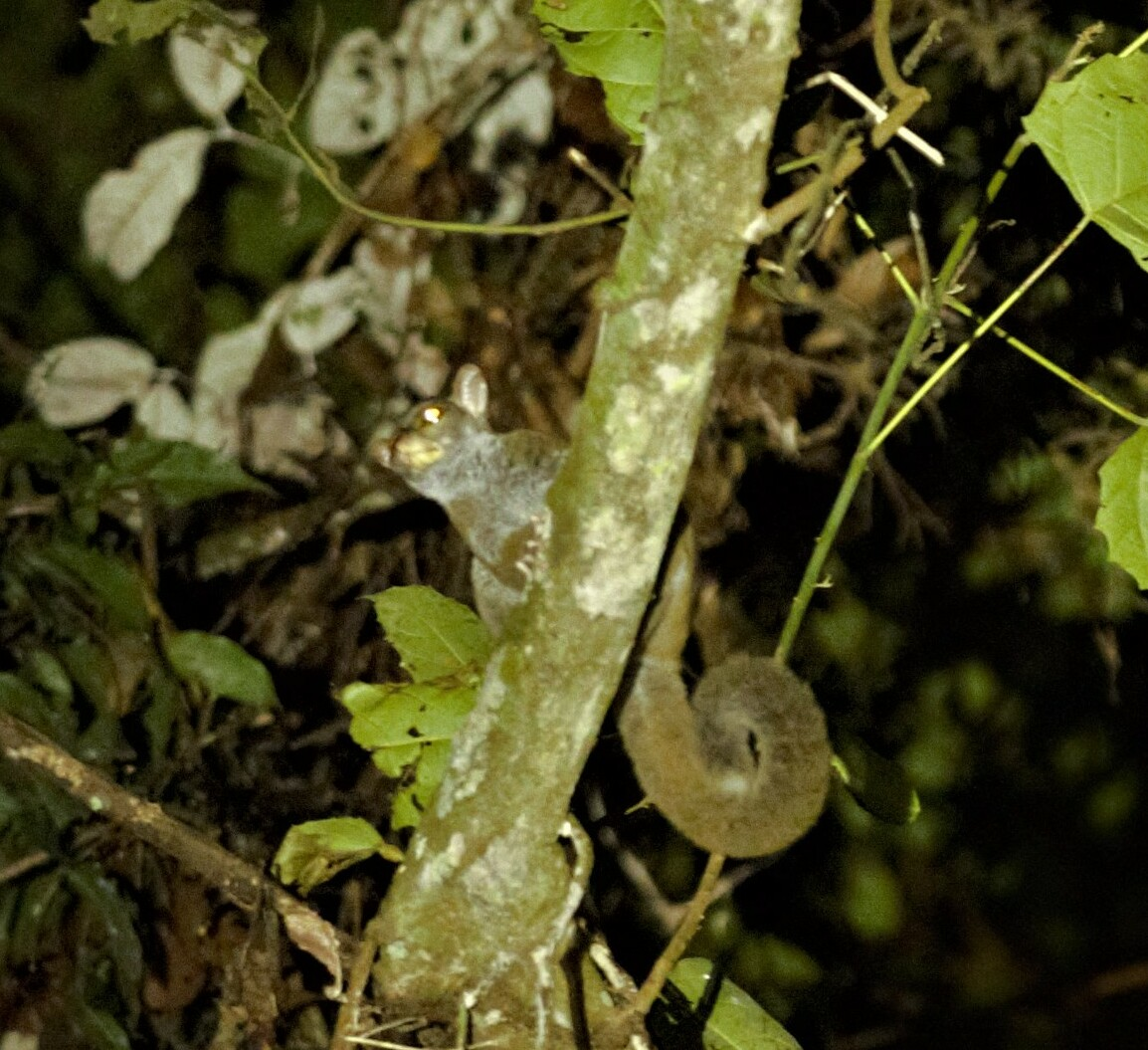

Conservation status
- Least Concern (IUCN 3.1)

Scientific classification
- Kingdom: Animalia
- Phylum: Chordata
- Class: Mammalia
- Infraclass: Placentalia
- Order: Primates
- Suborder: Strepsirrhini
- Family: Galagidae
- Genus: Euoticus
- Species: E. elegantulus

Binomial name
- Euoticus elegantulus (Le Conte, 1857)
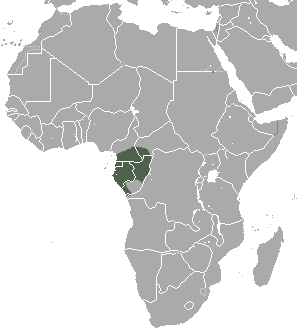
- Range

= Southern needle-clawed bushbaby =

Species of primate

The southern needle-clawed bushbaby (Euoticus elegantulus) is a species of strepsirrhine primate in the family Galagidae. Found in Cameroon, Central African Republic, Republic of the Congo, and possibly Democratic Republic of the Congo, its natural habitat is tropical moist forests. While the species is not threatened or endangered, some local populations may be threatened by habitat destruction.

== Description ==
This species is medium-sized, with a head-and-body length of 200 mm (8 in) and a tail of 290 mm (11.4 in). The sexes are similar in appearance, but there is considerable geographical variation in this species; animals from near the coast are larger and paler than those from inland. The upper parts of the body are bright orange, often darker on the shoulders, contrasting with the silvery-grey of the underparts and inner sides of the limbs. The tip of the tail is whitish in many individuals. In common with the northern needle-clawed bushbaby (Euoticus pallidus), the nails have strong ridges and end in sharp points, an adaptation for climbing about on large tree limbs. The southern species differs from the northern in having a narrow gap between the upper two central incisors, and the nasal bones being wider at the front. Both species differ from other galagos in having a single pair of nipples.

== Distribution and habitat ==
The southern needle-clawed bushbaby is found in western Central Africa where it is present in Cameroon, Central African Republic, Equatorial Guinea, Congo and possibly also in the Democratic Republic of Congo. Its range extends from the Sanaga River to the Congo River and the Ubangi River. It inhabits both primary and secondary forests, but is more common in secondary growth where there are larger numbers of gum and resin-producing trees.

== Ecology ==
Bushbabies in this genus are specialist consumers of gum. The distinctive teeth, with fan-like lower incisors with sharp-cutting edges, are probably used to enlarge wounds in tree limbs so that gum is exuded more freely. It is unlikely that these teeth are capable of making gashes in large limbs with thick bark, so the animal is probably reliant on wounds made by anomalures, cicadas and wood-boring beetles. Trees on which this species likes to feed include Albizia, Entada and Newtonia species. Other features which it shares with other specialised gum-eating primates, such as the Masoala fork-marked lemur, include a long, extensible tongue, an enlarged upper first premolar, a large caecum and sharp nails for climbing and gripping.

A solitary, nocturnal animal, the southern needle-clawed bushbaby communicates with other individuals by voice and by urine marking.

== Status ==
E. elegantulus has a wide range and is a common species. No specific threats have been recognised but in places it is locally threatened by deforestation. The population is steady and the range includes a number of protected areas, so the International Union for Conservation of Nature has assessed its conservation status as being of "least concern".
