= Muton's soft-furred mouse =

Conservation status
- Near Threatened (IUCN 3.1)

Scientific classification
- Kingdom: Animalia
- Phylum: Chordata
- Class: Mammalia
- Order: Rodentia
- Family: Muridae
- Genus: Praomys
- Species: P. mutoni

Binomial name
- Praomys mutoni Van der Straeten & Dudu, 1990

Species of rodent

Muton's soft-furred mouse or riverine praomys (Praomys mutoni) is a species of rodent in the family Muridae. It is found only in Democratic Republic of the Congo. Its natural habitats are subtropical or tropical swampland and rivers.
