= Forest soft-furred mouse =

Conservation status
- Least Concern (IUCN 3.1)

Scientific classification
- Kingdom: Animalia
- Phylum: Chordata
- Class: Mammalia
- Order: Rodentia
- Family: Muridae
- Genus: Praomys
- Species: P. rostratus

Binomial name
- Praomys rostratus (Miller, 1900)

Species of rodent

The forest soft-furred mouse or West African praomys (Praomys rostratus) is a species of rodent in the family Muridae. It is found in Ivory Coast, Ghana, Guinea, and Liberia. Its natural habitats are subtropical or tropical moist lowland forest and subtropical or tropical moist montane forest.
