= Gotel Mountain soft-furred mouse =

Conservation status
- Endangered (IUCN 3.1)

Scientific classification
- Kingdom: Animalia
- Phylum: Chordata
- Class: Mammalia
- Order: Rodentia
- Family: Muridae
- Genus: Praomys
- Species: P. obscurus

Binomial name
- Praomys obscurus Hutterer & Dieterlen, 1992

Synonyms
- Praomys hartwigi obscurus Hutterer & Dieterlen, 1992

Species of rodent

The Gotel Mountain soft-furred mouse (Praomys obscurus) or Gotel Mountain praomys, is a species of rodent in the family Muridae. It is endemic to the Gotel Mountains in southeastern Nigeria. It occurs in fern-grassland, montane forest, along streams in forest, gallery forest, and swamp forest, at elevations of 1,600–2,400 m (5,200–7,900 ft) above sea level. It is threatened by habitat loss (deforestation), presumably caused by logging and the conversion of land to agricultural and other uses.
