= Least soft-furred mouse =

Conservation status
- Least Concern (IUCN 3.1)

Scientific classification
- Kingdom: Animalia
- Phylum: Chordata
- Class: Mammalia
- Order: Rodentia
- Family: Muridae
- Genus: Praomys
- Species: P. minor

Binomial name
- Praomys minor Hatt, 1934

Species of rodent

The least soft-furred mouse or least praomys (Praomys minor) is a species of rodent in the family Muridae. It is found only in Democratic Republic of the Congo. Its natural habitat is subtropical or tropical moist lowland forest.
