= Cameroon soft-furred mouse =

Conservation status
- Endangered (IUCN 3.1)

Scientific classification
- Kingdom: Animalia
- Phylum: Chordata
- Class: Mammalia
- Order: Rodentia
- Family: Muridae
- Genus: Praomys
- Species: P. morio

Binomial name
- Praomys morio (Trouessart, 1881)

Species of rodent

The Cameroon soft-furred mouse or Cameroon praomys (Praomys morio) is a species of rodent in the family Muridae. It is found in Cameroon and Equatorial Guinea. Its natural habitat is subtropical or tropical moist montane forests. It is threatened by habitat loss.
