= De Graaff's soft-furred mouse =

Conservation status
- Least Concern (IUCN 3.1)

Scientific classification
- Kingdom: Animalia
- Phylum: Chordata
- Class: Mammalia
- Order: Rodentia
- Family: Muridae
- Genus: Praomys
- Species: P. degraaffi

Binomial name
- Praomys degraaffi Van der Straeten & Kerbis Peterhans, 1999

Species of rodent

De Graaff's soft-furred mouse (Praomys degraaffi) is a species of rodent in the family Muridae. It is found in Burundi, Rwanda, and Uganda. Its natural habitat is subtropical or tropical moist montane forests. It is threatened by habitat loss.
