= Misonne's soft-furred mouse =

Conservation status
- Least Concern (IUCN 3.1)

Scientific classification
- Kingdom: Animalia
- Phylum: Chordata
- Class: Mammalia
- Order: Rodentia
- Family: Muridae
- Genus: Praomys
- Species: P. misonnei

Binomial name
- Praomys misonnei Van der Straeten & Dieterlen, 1987

Species of rodent

Misonne's soft-furred mouse or Misonne's praomys (Praomys misonnei) is a species of rodent in the family Muridae. It is found in Democratic Republic of the Congo, Kenya, and Uganda. Its natural habitats are subtropical or tropical moist lowland forest, subtropical or tropical moist montane forest, and arable land.
