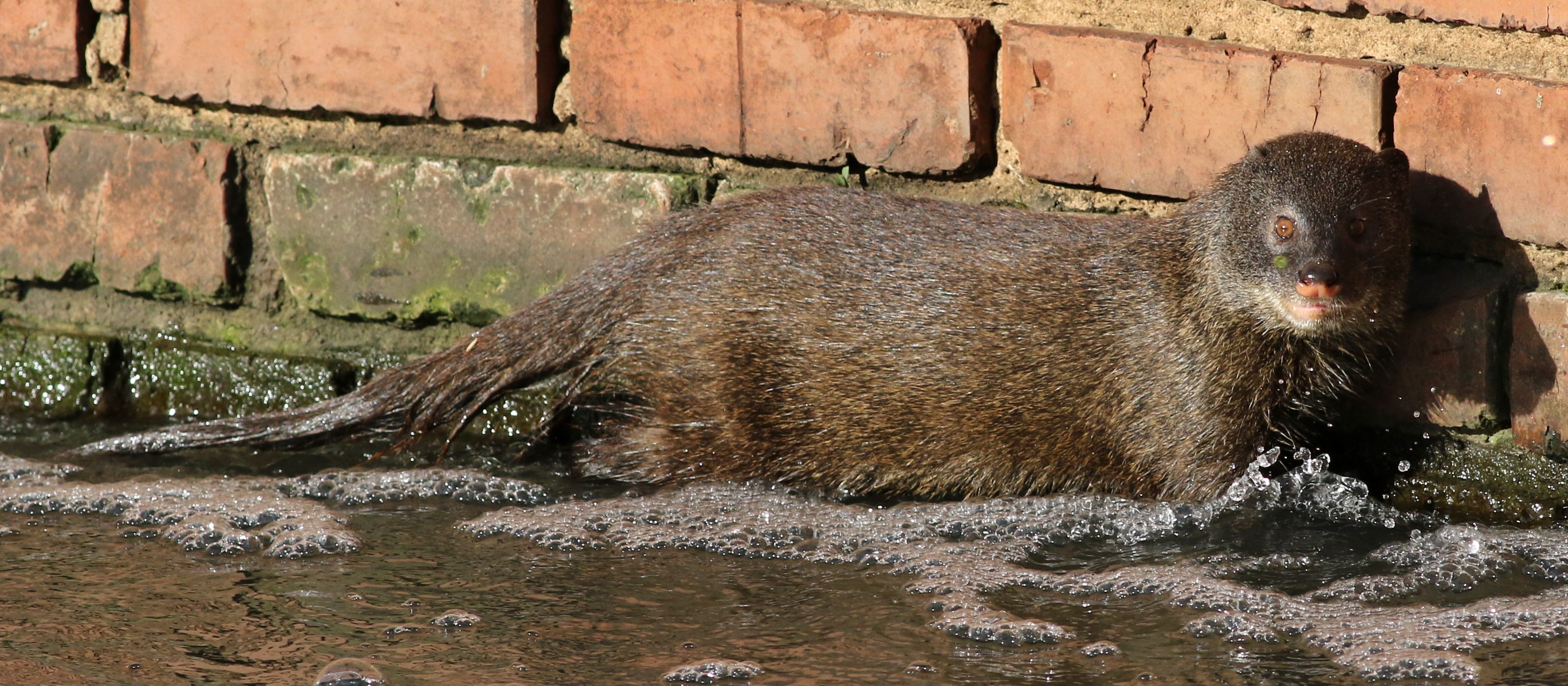

Conservation status
- Least Concern (IUCN 3.1)

Scientific classification
- Kingdom: Animalia
- Phylum: Chordata
- Class: Mammalia
- Infraclass: Placentalia
- Order: Carnivora
- Family: Herpestidae
- Subfamily: Herpestinae
- Genus: Atilax
- Species: A. paludinosus

Binomial name
- Atilax paludinosus G. Cuvier, 1829
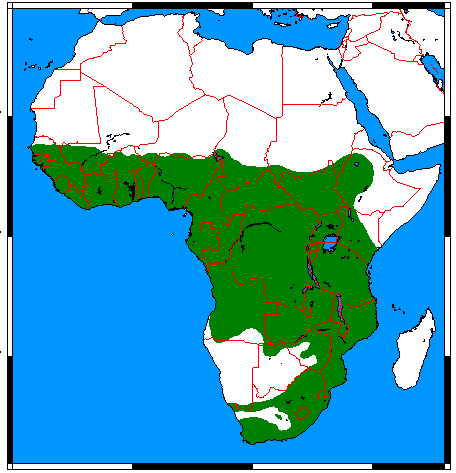

= Marsh mongoose =

Species of mongoose from Africa

The marsh mongoose (Atilax paludinosus), also called water mongoose, is a medium-sized mongoose species native to sub-Saharan Africa that inhabits freshwater wetlands. It has been listed as a Least-concern species on the IUCN Red List since 2008.

== Taxonomy ==
The generic name Atilax was introduced in 1826 by Frédéric Cuvier. In 1829, Georges Cuvier referred to a mongoose in the marshes of the Cape Province using the scientific name Herpestes paludinosus. It is the only extant member of the genus Atilax, although an extinct ancestral species from the Early Pleistocene known as Atilax mesotes was also a member of the genus.

== Characteristics ==
The marsh mongoose's fur is dark reddish brown to black with white and fawn coloured guard hairs. The hair behind the neck and in front of the back is short, but longer on the hind legs and on the tail. Its muzzle is short with a fawn coloured mouth, short whiskers and a naked rhinarium. It has 3.1.3.23.1.3.2 × 2 = 36 teeth. Its short ears are round. It has two nipples. Its feet have five flexible digits each with curved claws, but without any webbing. The soles of its feet are naked.

Females measure 48.72 cm (19.18 in) in head-to-body length, and males 51.38 cm (20.23 in), with a 32.18–34.11 cm (12.67–13.43 in) long tail. In weight, adults range from 2.56 to 2.95 kg (5.6 to 6.5 lb). Both sexes have anal glands in a pouch that produce a musky smelling secretion.

Female marsh mongooses have 36 chromosomes, and males 35, as one Y chromosome is translocated to an autosome.

== Distribution and habitat ==
The marsh mongoose occurs across much of sub-Saharan Africa from Senegal and The Gambia to Ethiopia, and throughout much of Central, Eastern and parts of Southern Africa. It inhabits freshwater wetlands, marshes and swamps along slow-moving rivers and streams, in forested, jungle and savanna regions. It is occurs in river deltas, estuarine and brackish-water habitats in coastal areas. It was likely introduced by humans to Pemba Island in the Zanzibar Archipelago.

In Guinea's National Park of Upper Niger, it was recorded during surveys conducted in 1996 to 1997. In Gabon's Moukalaba-Doudou National Park, it was recorded only in forested habitats during a two-month survey in 2012.

In the Ethiopian Highlands, it was recorded at an elevation of 3,950 m (12,960 ft) in Bale Mountains National Park.

== Behaviour and ecology ==
The marsh mongoose is primarily a solitary species. It is an excellent swimmer and can dive for up to 15 seconds, using its feet to paddle. On land, it usually trots slowly, but can also move fast. Radio-collared marsh mongooses in KwaZulu-Natal were active from shortly after sunset until after midnight showing a crepuscular activity pattern. A radio-collared male marsh mongoose in Dzanga-Sangha Special Reserve was most active during early mornings and late evenings, but rested by day in burrows situated in dry areas above water and mud in a dense cover of high grasses and climbing plants.

=== Feeding behaviour and diet ===
Feeding behaviour of eight captive marsh mongooses was studied in 1984. When the mongooses sighted prey in the water, they swam or walked towards it, used their digits to seek it out, but kept their heads above water. Once located, they grabbed it with the mouth and killed it outside the water. They killed rodents and frogs by biting them in the head, and occasionally also shook them. When finished eating, they wiped their mouths with the forefeet. They broke eggs by throwing them backwards between the legs. Scat of marsh mongooses collected around Lake St Lucia contained foremost remains of crustaceans, amphibians, insects and fish. Marsh mongooses were observed while carrying mudcrabs (Scylla serrata) ashore. They removed the chelipeds and opened the sternum to feed on the body contents. They deposit scat at specific latrine sites located on low shrubs, on rocks or sand well away from the water edge. Scat of marsh mongoose collected in a rocky coastal habitat contained remains of sandhoppers, shore crab (Cyclograpsus punctatus), pink-lipped topshell (Oxystele sinensis) and Tropidophora snails. Research in southeastern Nigeria revealed that the marsh mongoose has an omnivorous diet. It feeds on rodents like giant pouched rats (Cricetomys), Temminck's mouse (Mus musculoides), Tullberg's soft-furred mouse (Praomys tulbergi), grass frogs (Ptychadena), crowned bullfrog (Hoplobatrachus occipitalis), herald snake (Crotaphopeltis hotamboeia), mudskippers (Periophthalmus), insects such as spiders and Coleoptera, snails and slugs, Bivalvia, Decapoda as well as fruits, berries and seeds.

=== Reproduction ===
After a gestation of 69 to 80 days, females give birth to a litter of two to three young, which are fully furred. Their eyes open between the 9th and 14th day, pupils are bluish at first and change to brown at the age of three weeks. Their ear canal opens between the 17th and 28th day. Females start weaning their offspring earliest on the 30th day, and young are fully weaned by the age of two months.

== Threats ==
In 2006, it was estimated that about 950 marsh mongooses are hunted annually in the Cameroon part of the Cross–Sanaga–Bioko coastal forests.
