= Atilax mesotes =

Atilax mesotes Temporal range: Early Pleistocene

Scientific classification
- Domain: Eukaryota
- Kingdom: Animalia
- Phylum: Chordata
- Class: Mammalia
- Order: Carnivora
- Suborder: Feliformia
- Family: Herpestidae
- Genus: Atilax
- Species: †A. mesotes

Binomial name
- †Atilax mesotes Ewer, 1956

Extinct species of mongoose

Atilax mesotes is an extinct species of mongoose that lived in Africa during the Early Pleistocene around 1.98 million years ago.

Remains of this species were first found in the Kromdraai and included a complete skull and mandible. More material has been found at other places, such as the Malapa Fossil Site, all in South Africa.

It was originally described as Herpestes mesotes but was found to have many cranial features in common with the extant marsh mongoose, and may represent an ancestral form of the latter species that branched off from the Herpestes evolutionary line. The presence of Atilax mesotes at Malapa indicate the presence of water at the vicinity.

Atilax mesotes was a rather large species, comparable to the Egyptian mongoose (Herpestes ichneumon) in size based on its cranial measurements. It differs in its more robust cheek teeth, less reduced second molars and shorter palate behind the last molars.
