= Jackson's soft-furred mouse =

Conservation status
- Least Concern (IUCN 3.1)

Scientific classification
- Kingdom: Animalia
- Phylum: Chordata
- Class: Mammalia
- Order: Rodentia
- Family: Muridae
- Genus: Praomys
- Species: P. jacksoni

Binomial name
- Praomys jacksoni (de Winton, 1897)

Synonyms
- Praomys montis (Thomas & Wroughton, 1910); Praomys peromyscus (Hollister, 1909)

Species of rodent

Jackson's soft-furred mouse or Jackson's praomys (Praomys jacksoni) is a species of rodent in the family Muridae. It is found in Angola, Burundi, Cameroon, Central African Republic, Republic of the Congo, Democratic Republic of the Congo, Equatorial Guinea, Gabon, Guinea, Kenya, Nigeria, Rwanda, South Sudan, Tanzania, Uganda, and Zambia. Its natural habitats are subtropical or tropical moist lowland forest, subtropical or tropical moist montane forest, arable land, and heavily degraded former forest.
