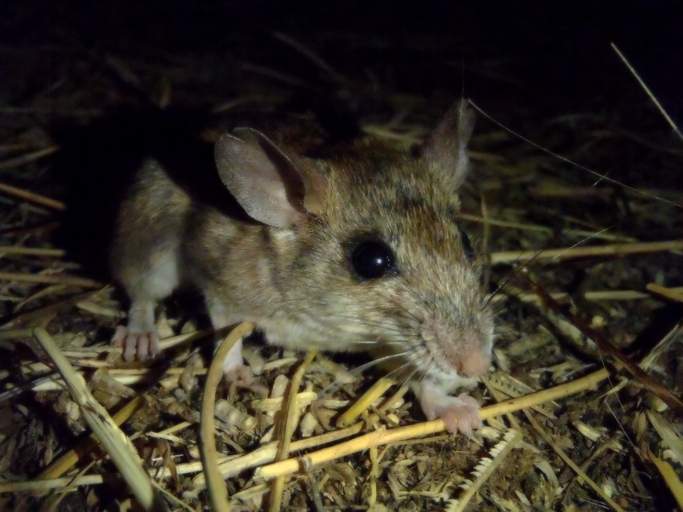

Conservation status
- Least Concern (IUCN 3.1)

Scientific classification
- Domain: Eukaryota
- Kingdom: Animalia
- Phylum: Chordata
- Class: Mammalia
- Order: Rodentia
- Family: Muridae
- Genus: Praomys
- Species: P. daltoni

Binomial name
- Praomys daltoni (Thomas, 1892)

Synonyms
- Myomys daltoni (Thomas, 1892)

= Dalton's mouse =

Species of rodent

Dalton's mouse or Dalton's praomys (Praomys daltoni) is a species of rodent in the family Muridae. It is found in Benin, Burkina Faso, Cameroon, Central African Republic, Chad, Ivory Coast, Gambia, Ghana, Guinea, Guinea-Bissau, Liberia, Mali, Niger, Nigeria, Senegal, Sierra Leone, Sudan, and Togo. Its natural habitats are dry savanna, rocky areas, and urban areas.
