= Deroo's mouse =

Conservation status
- Least Concern (IUCN 3.1)

Scientific classification
- Domain: Eukaryota
- Kingdom: Animalia
- Phylum: Chordata
- Class: Mammalia
- Order: Rodentia
- Family: Muridae
- Genus: Praomys
- Species: P. derooi

Binomial name
- Praomys derooi (Van der Straeten & Verheyen, 1978)

Synonyms
- Myomys derooi Van der Straeten & Verheyen, 1978

Species of rodent

Deroo's mouse or Deroo's praomys (Praomys derooi) is a species of rodent in the family Muridae. It is found in Benin, Ghana, Nigeria, and Togo. Its natural habitats are dry savanna and urban areas.
