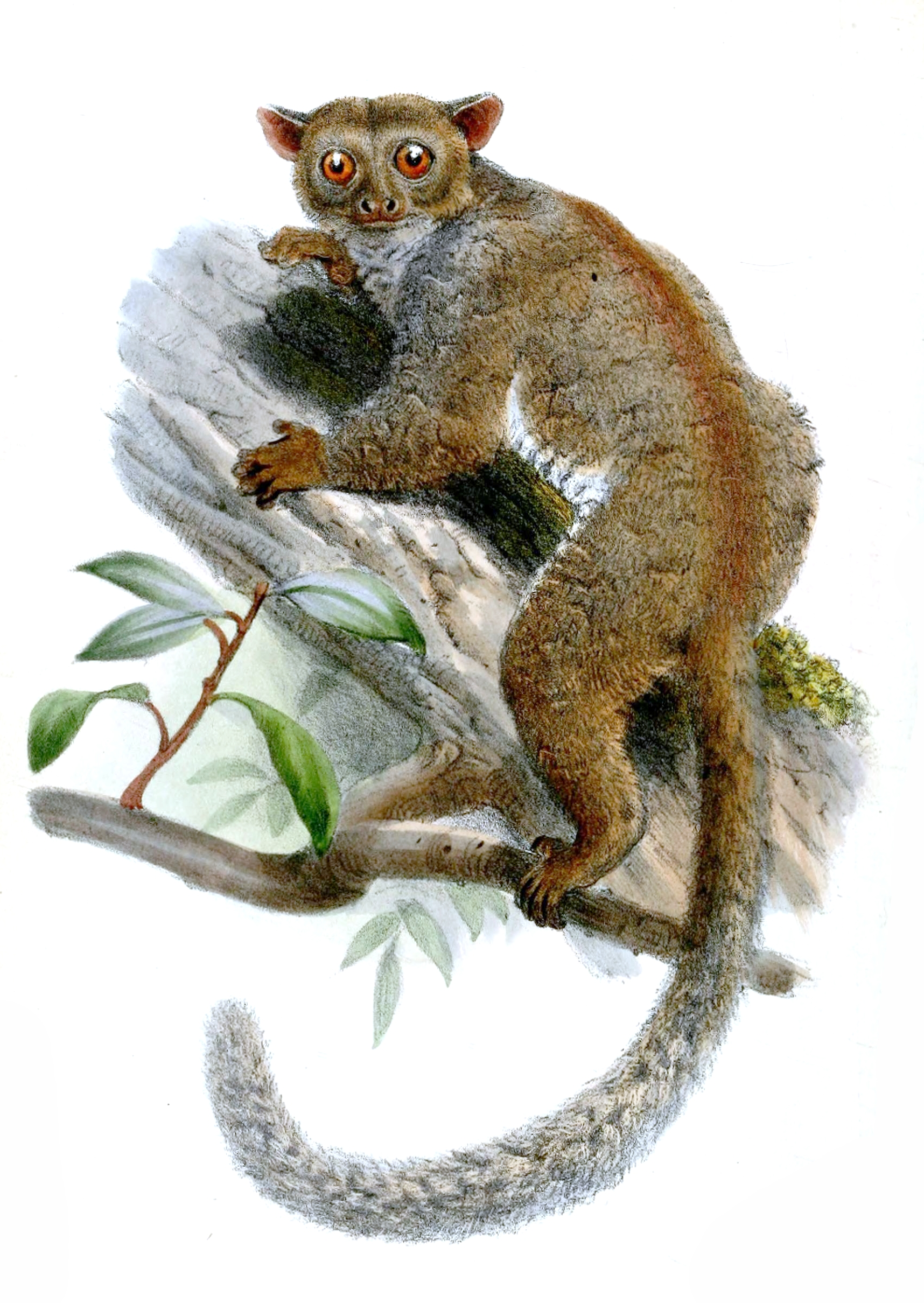
- Northern needle-clawed bushbaby, E. pallidus

Scientific classification
- Kingdom: Animalia
- Phylum: Chordata
- Class: Mammalia
- Order: Primates
- Suborder: Strepsirrhini
- Family: Galagidae
- Genus: Euoticus; J.E. Gray, 1863

Type species
- Otogale pallida J.E. Gray, 1863

Species
- Euoticus elegantulus Euoticus pallidus

= Needle-clawed bushbaby =

Euoticus

Genus of primates

The needle-clawed bushbabies are the two species in the genus Euoticus, which is in the family Galagidae. Galagidae is sometimes included as a subfamily within the Lorisidae (or Loridae).

Unique to the needle-clawed bushbaby are the keeled nails, featuring prominent central ridges ending in needle-like points, present on all digits except the thumbs, the big toes, and the second foot phalanges which have claws.

The first specimen of E. elegantulus to arrive in Europe from Africa was brought by Gerald Durrell. The uncovering of this bush baby is documented in his 1957 book A Zoo in My Luggage.

The needle-clawed bushbabies have a diet that consists of insects, fruits and gums. Gum tends to be the largest contribute to their diet since 75% of their diet is base around gum.

Genus Euoticus – Gray, 1863 – two species
Common name	Scientific name and subspecies	Range	Size and ecology	IUCN status and estimated population
Northern needle-clawed bushbaby	E. pallidus (Gray, 1863) Two subspecies: E. p. pallidus (Bioko needle-clawed bushbaby); E. p. talboti (Nigeria needle-clawed bushbaby)	Western equatorial Africa	Size: 18–33 cm (7–13 in) long, plus 28–31 cm (11–12 in) tail Habitat: Forest Diet: Tree gums and resins	NT Unknown
Southern needle-clawed bushbaby	E. elegantulus (Conte, 1857)	Western equatorial Africa	Size: 21–24 cm (8–9 in) long, plus 28–32 cm (11–13 in) tail Habitat: Forest Diet: Tree and liana gums and resins, as well as invertebrates	LC Unknown
