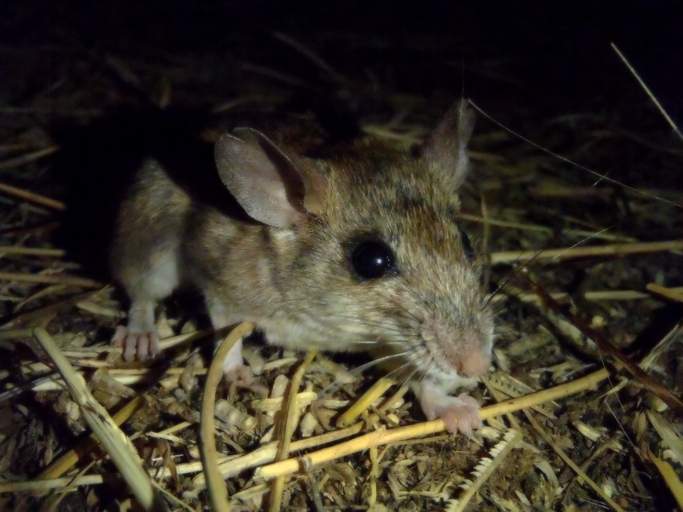
- Praomys daltoni

Scientific classification
- Domain: Eukaryota
- Kingdom: Animalia
- Phylum: Chordata
- Class: Mammalia
- Order: Rodentia
- Family: Muridae
- Tribe: Praomyini
- Genus: Praomys; Thomas, 1915

Type species
- Epimys tullbergi

Species
- Praomys coetzeei Praomys daltoni Praomys degraaffi Praomys derooi Praomys hartwigi Praomys jacksoni Praomys minor Praomys misonnei Praomys morio Praomys mutoni Praomys obscurus Praomys petteri Praomys rostratus Praomys tullbergi

= Praomys =

Praomys Temporal range: Late Pliocene - Recent

Genus of rodents

Praomys is a genus of rodent in the family Muridae endemic to Sub-Saharan Africa. It contains the following species:

- Praomys coetzeei
- Dalton's mouse, Praomys daltoni
- De Graaff's soft-furred mouse, Praomys degraaffi
- Deroo's mouse, Praomys derooi
- Hartwig's soft-furred mouse, Praomys hartwigi
- Jackson's soft-furred mouse, Praomys jacksoni
- Least soft-furred mouse, Praomys minor
- Misonne's soft-furred mouse, Praomys misonnei
- Cameroon soft-furred mouse, Praomys morio
- Muton's soft-furred mouse, Praomys mutoni
- Gotel Mountain soft-furred mouse, Praomys obscurus
- Petter's soft-furred mouse, Praomys petteri
- Forest soft-furred mouse, Praomys rostratus
- Tullberg's soft-furred mouse, Praomys tullbergi
