= Hartwig's soft-furred mouse =

Conservation status
- Vulnerable (IUCN 3.1)

Scientific classification
- Domain: Eukaryota
- Kingdom: Animalia
- Phylum: Chordata
- Class: Mammalia
- Order: Rodentia
- Family: Muridae
- Genus: Praomys
- Species: P. hartwigi

Binomial name
- Praomys hartwigi Eisentraut, 1968

Species of rodent

Hartwig's soft-furred mouse or Hartwig's praomys (Praomys hartwigi) is a species of rodent in the family Muridae. It is found only in Cameroon. Its natural habitat is subtropical or tropical moist montane forest. It is threatened by habitat loss.
