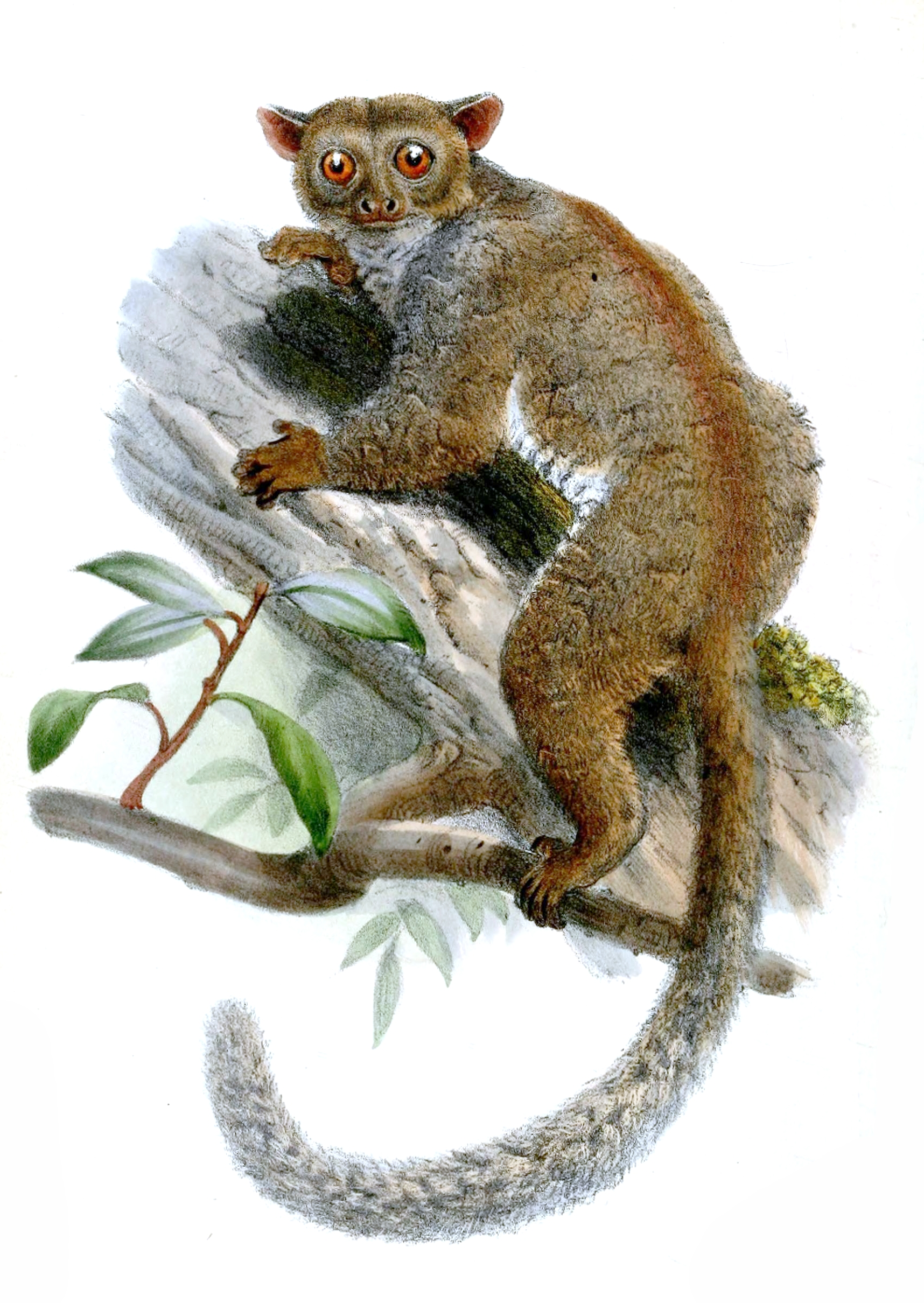

Conservation status
- Near Threatened (IUCN 3.1)

Scientific classification
- Kingdom: Animalia
- Phylum: Chordata
- Class: Mammalia
- Infraclass: Placentalia
- Order: Primates
- Suborder: Strepsirrhini
- Family: Galagidae
- Genus: Euoticus
- Species: E. pallidus

Binomial name
- Euoticus pallidus (J. E. Gray, 1863)
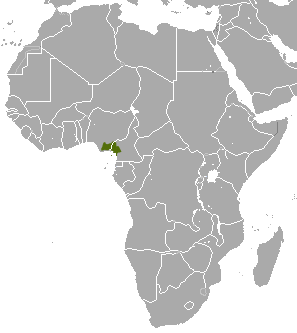
- Northern needle-clawed bushbaby range

= Northern needle-clawed bushbaby =

Species of primate

The northern needle-clawed bushbaby (Euoticus pallidus) is a species of strepsirrhine primate in the family Galagidae. It is found in the coastal region of Cameroon and Nigeria, and on the island of Bioko, Equatorial Guinea in lower-elevation forests that provide its specialized diet of tree gum and resins.

== Description ==
This is a medium-sized species with a head-and-body length of 180 mm (7 in) and a tail of 190 mm (7.5 in). Members of this genus have long limbs and large hands and feet. The fur is woolly and they have short, blunt snouts, large orange eyes and bony ridges surrounding the eyes. The nails on both hands and feet are keeled, and are elongated forward into sharp points. These nails are an adaptation to help provide grip on large branches of trees. The upper parts of this bushbaby, and the outer parts of the limbs, are reddish-grey or reddish-buff, being greyer on the neck, shoulders, arms and tail. Some individuals have a dark greyish-brown dorsal stripe running from the shoulders to the root of the tail. The tail is the same colour as the back, fading gradually to grey near the tip. The underparts are yellowish or whitish-grey. The northern needle-clawed bushbaby differs from the southern needle-clawed bushbaby in having a wide gap between the two upper central incisors, and the nasal bones being narrower at the front and broader behind. Both species differ from other bushbabies in having a single pair of nipples.

== Distribution and habitat ==
The northern needle-clawed bushbaby is endemic to west central Africa where its range extends from the Niger River, in Nigeria, to the Sanaga River in Cameroon. The subspecies E. p. pallidus is present on the island of Bioko in the Gulf of Guinea, while the subspecies E. p. talboti occurs over the rest of the range. It is found in both primary and secondary moist lowland forest, mostly in the upper and middle parts of the canopy. It also occurs at higher altitudes in high rainfall areas such as Mount Kupe and Mount Cameroon.

== Ecology ==
This bushbaby feeds mainly on gum which exudes from the trunk and branches of trees; this is gathered with a "toothcomb", formed by the enlarged lower incisors. It also feeds on invertebrates, catching them with both hands, and sometimes hanging by two feet while doing so. It clambers about among the branches, sometimes descending the trunk head first. It can make horizontal leaps between trees, or can drop vertically, legs splayed. It forages alone but communicates vocally with others and sleeps communally. Little is known of its reproductive habits.

== Status ==
E. pallidus may be threatened by habitat destruction where its forest habitat has been fragmented by logging and conversion to agriculture. However, part of its range is in protected areas including the Cross River National Park (Nigeria), Korup National Park, and Banyang - Mbo Wildlife Sanctuary (Cameroon), and the Southern Highlands Scientific Reserve (Bioko). The International Union for Conservation of Nature assessed its conservation status in 2008 as being near-threatened but listed its current population trend as "unknown."
