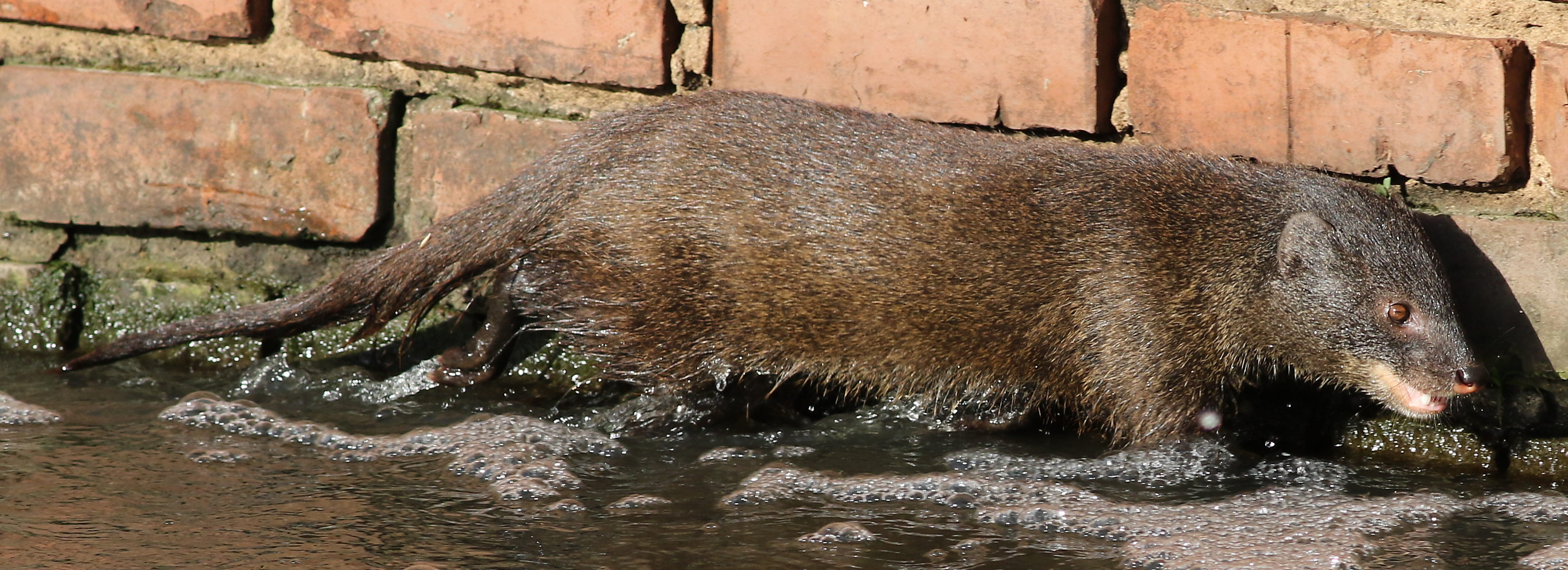
- Marsh mongoose (Atilax paludinosus)

Scientific classification
- Kingdom: Animalia
- Phylum: Chordata
- Class: Mammalia
- Order: Carnivora
- Family: Herpestidae
- Subfamily: Herpestinae
- Genus: Atilax; F. Cuvier, 1826

Species
- Atilax paludinosus; †Atilax mesotes

= Atilax =

Atilax Temporal range: Early Pleistocene - Recent

Genus of mammal

Atilax is a genus of mongoose containing a single living species, the marsh mongoose (Atilax paludinosus). A single fossil species probably ancestral to the marsh mongoose is also known from South Africa.

The generic name Atilax was introduced in 1826 by Frédéric Cuvier.

They are solitary, nocturnal, and semi-aquatic mammals that inhabits wetlands and feeds on fish, crustaceans, frogs, and small mammals.
