= Tullberg's soft-furred mouse =

Conservation status
- Least Concern (IUCN 3.1)

Scientific classification
- Kingdom: Animalia
- Phylum: Chordata
- Class: Mammalia
- Order: Rodentia
- Family: Muridae
- Genus: Praomys
- Species: P. tullbergi

Binomial name
- Praomys tullbergi (Thomas, 1894)

Species of rodent

Tullberg's soft-furred mouse or Tullberg's praomys (Praomys tullbergi) is a species of rodent in the family Muridae in Africa. It is found in Angola, Benin, Cameroon, Republic of the Congo, Democratic Republic of the Congo, Ivory Coast, Equatorial Guinea, Gabon, Gambia, Ghana, Guinea, Liberia, Mali, Nigeria, Senegal, Sierra Leone, Togo, possibly Burkina Faso, and possibly Guinea-Bissau. Its natural habitats are subtropical or tropical moist lowland forest and subtropical or tropical moist montane forest.
