= List of rodents =

Animals in mammal order Rodentia

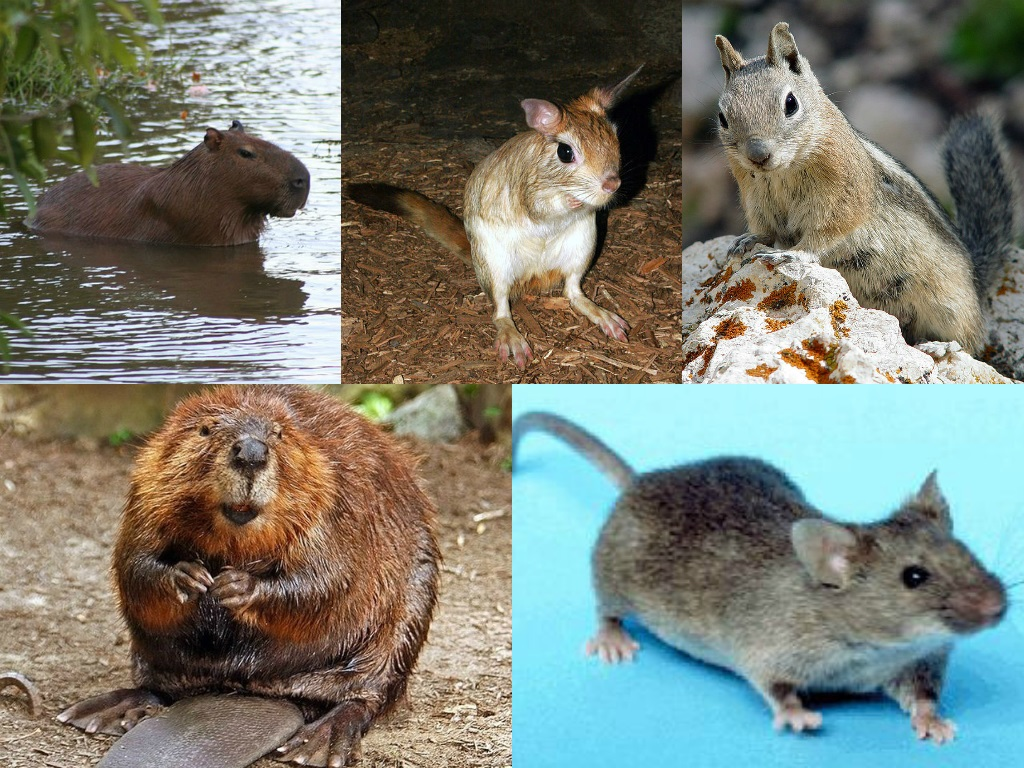
Clockwise from top-left: capybara (Hydrochoerus hydrochaeris), South African springhare (Pedetes capensis), golden-mantled ground squirrel (Callospermophilus lateralis), house mouse (Mus musculus), North American beaver (Castor canadensis)

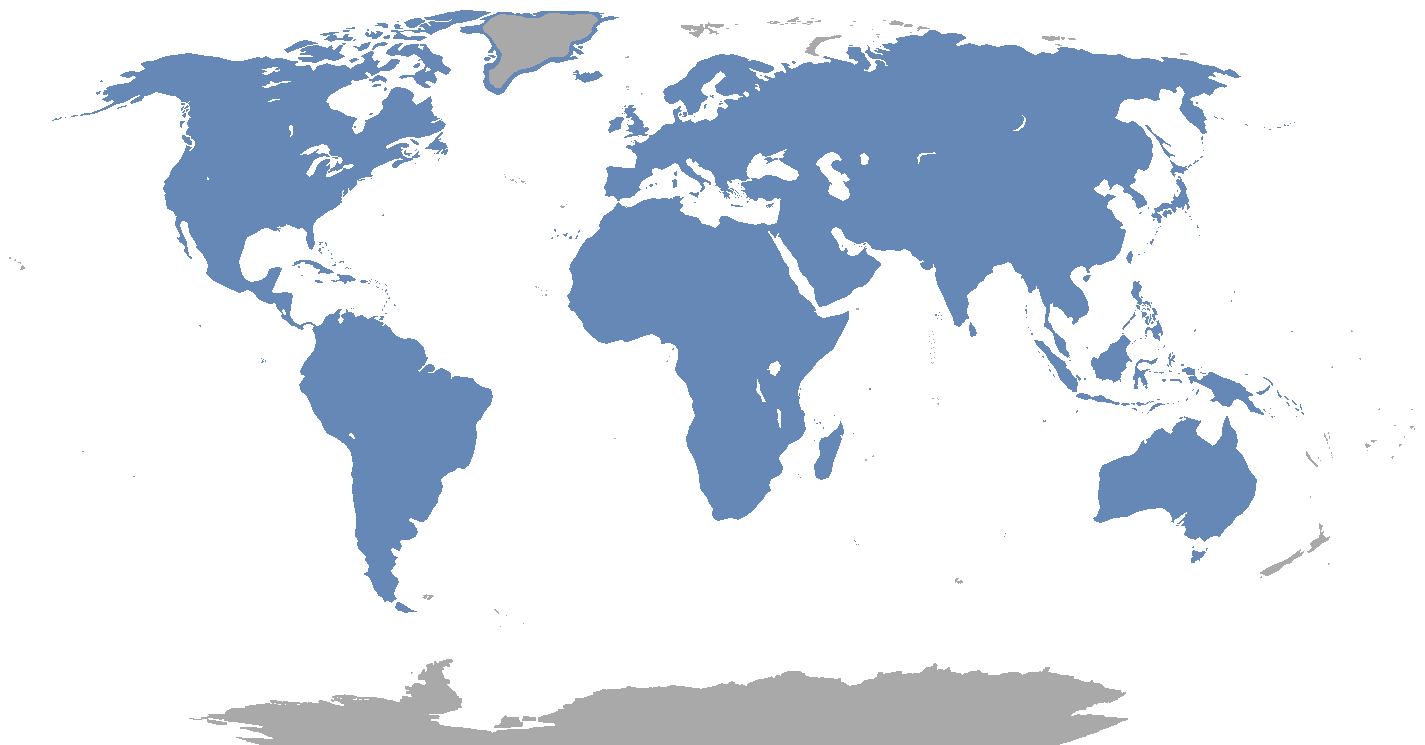
Worldwide distribution of rodent species

Rodentia is an order of placental mammals. Members of this order are called rodents. The order comprises 2,362 extant species, which are grouped into 513 genera. The largest order of mammals, rodents comprise about 40% of all mammal species worldwide. They are native to all major land masses except for Antarctica, and can be found worldwide. They live in a variety of habitats, particularly forests, grasslands, and shrublands, but also savannas, wetlands, deserts, and rocky areas. Most rodents are small animals with robust bodies, short limbs, and long tails. They range in length from the African pygmy mouse, at 4 cm (2 in) plus a 2 cm (1 in) tail, to the capybara, at 134 cm (53 in) plus a 2 cm (1 in) tail.

Rodentia is divided into five suborders: Anomaluromorpha, Castorimorpha, Hystricomorpha, Myomorpha, and Sciuromorpha. The suborders are further subdivided into clades and families. Anomaluromorpha contains two families, the scaly-tailed squirrels and the springhares. Castorimorpha is composed of three families and includes beavers, gophers, kangaroo rats, and pocket mice. There are 18 families in Hystricomorpha, which includes mole-rats, porcupines, cavies, hutias, tuco-tucos, and Neotropical spiny rats. Myomorpha contains nine families and includes jerboas, hamsters, voles, and a wide variety of rats and mice. The final three families of the order are in Sciuromorpha, which includes squirrels, chipmunks, and dormice. The exact organization of the species is not fixed, with many recent proposals made based on molecular phylogenetic analysis. In addition to the extant rodents, 38 species have been driven extinct since 1500 CE.

== Conventions ==
The author citation for the species or genus is given after the scientific name; parentheses around the author citation indicate that this was not the original taxonomic placement. Range maps are provided wherever possible; if a range map is not available, a description of the collective range of species in that genera is provided. Ranges are based on the International Union for Conservation of Nature (IUCN) Red List of Threatened Species unless otherwise noted. All extinct genera or species listed alongside extant species went extinct after 1500 CE, and are indicated by a dagger symbol "†".

== Classification ==
The order Rodentia consists of 2,362 extant species belonging to 513 genera. This does not include hybrid species or extinct prehistoric species. Modern molecular studies indicate that the 511 genera can be grouped into 35 families; these families are divided between 5 named suborders and are grouped in those suborders into named clades, and some of these families are subdivided into named subfamilies. An additional 38 species have been driven extinct since 1500 CE: 8 in the family Capromyidae, 6 in Echimyidae, 11 in Cricetidae, and 13 in Muridae.

Suborder Anomaluromorpha

- Family Anomaluridae (scaly-tailed squirrels): 3 genera, 7 species
- Family Pedetidae (springhares): 1 genus, 2 species

Suborder Castorimorpha

- Superfamily Castoroidea
  - Family Castoridae (beavers): 1 genus, 2 species
- Superfamily Geomyoidea
  - Family Geomyidae (gophers): 7 genera, 36 species
  - Family Heteromyidae (kangaroo rats and pocket mice)
    - Subfamily Dipodomyinae (kangaroo rats, and kangaroo mice): 2 genera, 22 species
    - Subfamily Heteromyinae (spiny pocket mice): 1 genus, 14 species
    - Subfamily Perognathinae (pocket mice): 2 genera, 27 species

Suborder Hystricomorpha

- Parvorder Caviomorpha
  - Superfamily Cavioidea
    - Family Caviidae (cavies)
      - Subfamily Caviinae (guinea pigs and cavies): 3 genera, 15 species
      - Subfamily Dolichotinae (maras): 1 genus, 2 species
      - Subfamily Hydrochoerinae (capybaras and rock cavies): 2 genera, 4 species
    - Family Cuniculidae (pacas): 1 genus, 2 species
    - Family Dasyproctidae (agoutis and achouchis): 2 genera, 15 species
  - Superfamily Chinchilloidea
    - Family Dinomyidae (pacarana): 1 genus, 1 species
    - Family Chinchillidae (chinchillas and viscachas): 2 genera, 7 species (1 extinct)
  - Superfamily Erethizontoidea
    - Family Erethizontidae (New World porcupines)
      - Subfamily Chaetomyinae (bristle-spined rat): 1 genus, 1 species
      - Subfamily Erethizontinae (prehensile-tailed porcupines): 2 genera, 17 species
  - Superfamily Octodontoidea
    - Family Abrocomidae (chinchilla rats): 2 genera, 10 species
    - Family Capromyidae (hutias)
      - Subfamily Capromyinae (hutias): 4 genera, 11 species (2 extinct)
      - Subfamily Hexolobodontinae † (imposter hutia): 1 genus, 1 species (1 extinct)
      - Subfamily Isolobodontinae † (laminar-toothed hutias): 1 genus, 2 species (2 extinct)
      - Subfamily Plagiodontinae (Hispaniolan hutias): 3 genera, 4 species (3 extinct)
    - Family Ctenomyidae (tuco-tucos): 1 genus, 61 species
    - Family Echimyidae (Neotropical spiny rats)
      - Subfamily Carterodontinae (Owl's spiny rat): 1 genus, 1 species
      - Subfamily Echimyinae (tree-rats, bamboo rats, and brush-tailed rats): 18 genera, 75 species
      - Subfamily Euryzygomatomyinae (Atlantic spiny rats): 3 genera, 12 species
      - Subfamily Heteropsomyinae † (cave rats): 3 genera, 6 species (6 extinct)
    - Family Octodontidae (degus, rock rats, and viscacha rats): 7 genera, 14 species
- Superfamily Ctenodactyloidea
  - Family Ctenodactylidae (gundis): 4 genera, 5 species
  - Family Diatomyidae (Laotian rock rat): 1 genus, 1 species
- Family Hystricidae (Old World porcupines): 3 genera, 11 species
- Parvorder Phiomorpha
  - Family Bathyergidae (mole-rats): 5 genera, 21 species
  - Family Heterocephalidae (naked mole-rat): 1 genus, 1 species
  - Family Petromuridae (dassie rat): 1 genus, 1 species
  - Family Thryonomyidae (cane rats): 1 genus, 2 species

Suborder Myomorpha

- Superfamily Dipodoidea
  - Family Dipodidae (jerboas)
    - Subfamily Allactaginae (jerboas): 4 genera, 16 species
    - Subfamily Cardiocraniinae (pygmy jerboas): 3 genera, 7 species
    - Subfamily Dipodinae (three-toed jerboas): 5 genera, 9 species
    - Subfamily Euchoreutinae (long-eared jerboa): 1 genus, 1 species
  - Family Sminthidae (birch mice): 1 genus, 16 species
  - Family Zapodidae (jumping mice): 3 genera, 5 species
- Superfamily Muroidea
  - Family Calomyscidae (brush-tailed mice): 1 genus, 8 species
  - Family Cricetidae (New World rats and mice)
    - Subfamily Arvicolinae (voles, lemmings, and muskrats): 30 genera, 158 species
    - Subfamily Cricetinae (hamsters): 9 genera, 18 species
    - Subfamily Neotominae (deer mice, packrats, and grasshopper mice): 16 genera, 124 species (1 extinct)
    - Subfamily Sigmodontinae (New World rats and mice): 87 genera, 395 species (10 extinct)
    - Subfamily Tylomyinae (vesper rats and climbing rats): 4 genera, 10 species
  - Family Muridae (Old World rats and mice)
    - Subfamily Deomyinae (spiny mice and brush-furred rats): 4 genera, 55 species
    - Subfamily Gerbillinae (gerbils, jirds, and sand rats): 14 genera, 102 species
    - Subfamily Leimacomyinae (Togo mouse): 1 genus, 1 species
    - Subfamily Lophiomyinae (maned rat): 1 genus, 1 species
    - Subfamily Murinae (Old World mice and rats): 136 genera, 655 species (13 extinct)
  - Family Nesomyidae (African and Malagasy rats and mice)
    - Subfamily Cricetomyinae (hamster-rats and pouched rats): 3 genera, 8 species
    - Subfamily Delanymyinae (Delany's mouse): 1 genus, 1 species
    - Subfamily Dendromurinae (climbing mice and fat mice): 6 genera, 26 species
    - Subfamily Mystromyinae (white-tailed rat): 1 genus, 1 species
    - Subfamily Nesomyinae (Malagasy rodents): 9 genera, 27 species
    - Subfamily Petromyscinae (rock mice): 1 genus, 4 species
  - Family Platacanthomyidae (Oriental dormice): 2 genera, 2 species
  - Family Spalacidae (mole-rats)
    - Subfamily Myospalacinae (zokors): 2 genera, 6 species
    - Subfamily Rhizomyinae (bamboo rats and mole-rats): 3 genera, 6 species
    - Subfamily Spalacinae (blind mole-rats): 2 genera, 11 species

Suborder Sciuromorpha

- Family Aplodontiidae (mountain beaver): 1 genus, 1 species
- Family Gliridae (dormice)
  - Subfamily Glirinae (Japanese dormice and edible dormice): 2 genera, 2 species
  - Subfamily Graphiurinae (African dormice): 1 genus, 15 species
  - Subfamily Leithiinae (dormice): 6 genera, 12 species
- Family Sciuridae (squirrels, chipmunks, and marmots)
  - Subfamily Callosciurinae (Asian squirrels): 14 genera, 67 species
  - Subfamily Ratufinae (giant squirrels): 1 genus, 4 species
  - Subfamily Sciurillinae (Neotropical pygmy squirrel): 1 genus, 1 species
  - Subfamily Sciurinae (tree squirrels and flying squirrels): 20 genera, 2 species
  - Subfamily Xerinae (ground squirrels, chipmunks, and prairie dogs): 24 genera, 2 species

- Rodentia
  - - Sciuromorpha
      - Gliridae
      - - Aplodontiidae
        - Sciuridae
  - - - Hystricomorpha
        - - Ctenodactyloidea
            - Ctenodactylidae
            - Diatomyidae
        - - Hystricidae
          - - Phiomorpha
              - - Bathyergidae
                - Heterocephalidae
              - - Petromuridae
                - Thryonomyidae
            - Caviomorpha
              - - - Cavioidea
                    - Cuniculidae
                    - - Caviidae
                      - Dasyproctidae
                - - Erethizontoidea
                    Erethizontidae
              - - Chinchilloidea
                  - Dinomyidae
                  - Chinchillidae
                - Octodontoidea
                  - Abrocomidae
                  - - - Capromyidae
                      - Echimyidae
                    - - Ctenomyidae
                      - Octodontidae
    - - - Castorimorpha
          - Castoroidea
            Castoridae
          - Geomyoidea
            - Heteromyidae
            - Geomyidae
      - - Anomaluromorpha
          - Anomaluridae
          - Pedetidae
        - Myomorpha
          - Dipodoidea
            - Sminthidae
            - - Dipodidae
              - Zapodidae
          - Muroidea
            - Platacanthomyidae
            - - Spalacidae
              - - Calomyscidae
                - - Nesomyidae
                  - - Cricetidae
                    - Muridae

== Rodents ==
The following classification is based on the taxonomy described by Mammal Species of the World (2005), with augmentation by generally accepted proposals made since using molecular phylogenetic analysis, as supported by both the IUCN and the American Society of Mammalogists.

=== Suborder Anomaluromorpha ===
==== Family Anomaluridae ====
Members of the Anomaluridae family are called anomalurids or scaly-tailed squirrels. They eat a variety of vegetation, and some also eat insects. Anomaluridae comprises seven extant species, divided into three genera.

Not assigned to a named subfamily – three genera
Name	Authority and species	Range	Size and ecology
Anomalurus (scaly-tailed flying squirrel)	Gervais, 1849 Four species: A. beecrofti (Beecroft's flying squirrel); A. derbianus (Lord Derby's scaly-tailed flying squirrel, pictured); A. pelii (Pel's flying squirrel); A. pusillus (Dwarf scaly-tailed squirrel)	Sub-Saharan Africa (in red)	Size range: 19 cm (7 in) long, plus 12 cm (5 in) tail (dwarf scaly-tailed squirrel) to 46 cm (18 in) long, plus 45 cm (18 in) tail (Pel's flying squirrel) Habitats: Forest Diets: Bark and fruit as well as flowers, leaves, nuts, and insects
Idiurus (flying mice)	Matschie, 1894 Two species: I. macrotis (Long-eared flying mouse, pictured); I. zenkeri (Pygmy scaly-tailed flying squirrel)	Central and western Africa (in blue)	Size range: 6 cm (2 in) long, plus 7 cm (3 in) tail (pygmy scaly-tailed flying squirrel) to 12 cm (5 in) long, plus 19 cm (7 in) tail (long-eared flying mouse) Habitats: Forest Diets: Fruit
Zenkerella	Matschie, 1898 One species: Z. insignis (Cameroon scaly-tail)	West-central Africa (in purple)	Size range: 18–23 cm (7–9 in) long, plus 15–18 cm (6–7 in) tail Habitats: Forest and savanna Diets: Vegetation

==== Family Pedetidae ====
Members of the Pedetidae family are called pedetids or springhares. They eat bulbs and roots, as well as stems and grain. Pedetidae comprises two extant species in a single genus.

Not assigned to a named subfamily – one genus
Name	Authority and species	Range	Size and ecology
Pedetes (springhare)	Illiger, 1811 Two species: P. capensis (South African springhare, pictured); P. surdaster (East African springhare)	Southern and eastern Africa	Size range: 34–46 cm (13–18 in) long, plus 39–48 cm (15–19 in) tail Habitats: Savanna, shrubland, and grassland Diets: Bulbs and roots, as well as stems and grain

=== Suborder Castorimorpha ===
==== Superfamily Castoroidea ====
===== Family Castoridae =====
Members of the Castoridae family are called castorids or beavers. They eat woody and aquatic plants. Castoridae comprises two extant species in a single genus.

Not assigned to a named subfamily – one genus
Name	Authority and species	Range	Size and ecology
Castor (beaver)	Linnaeus, 1758 Two species: C. canadensis (North American beaver, pictured); C. fiber (Eurasian beaver)	North America, Europe, and Asia	Size range: 80–90 cm (31–35 in) long, plus 20–30 cm (8–12 in) tail Habitats: Forest, shrubland, and inland wetlands Diets: Bark, twigs, leaves, aquatic plants, and tree and shrub roots

==== Superfamily Geomyoidea ====
===== Family Geomyidae =====
Members of the Geomyidae family are called geomyids, pocket gophers, or gophers. They primarily eat roots, bulbs, and rhizomes, as well as other vegetation. Geomyidae comprises 36 extant species in 7 genera.

Not assigned to a named subfamily – seven genera
Name	Authority and species	Range	Size and ecology
Cratogeomys (pocket gopher)	Merriam, 1895 Seven species: C. castanops (Yellow-faced pocket gopher, pictured); C. fulvescens (Oriental Basin pocket gopher); C. fumosus (Smoky pocket gopher); C. goldmani (Goldman's pocket gopher); C. merriami (Merriam's pocket gopher); C. perotensis (Perote pocket gopher); C. planiceps (Volcan de Toluca pocket gopher)	Southern United States and Mexico	Size range: 14 cm (6 in) long, plus 5 cm (2 in) tail (Goldman's pocket gopher) to 28 cm (11 in) long, plus 13 cm (5 in) tail (Merriam's pocket gopher) Habitats: Grassland, shrubland, forest, and desert Diets: A variety of roots and vegetation, including cacti
Geomys (eastern pocket gopher)	Rafinesque, 1817 Nine species: G. arenarius (Desert pocket gopher); G. attwateri (Attwater's pocket gopher); G. breviceps (Baird's pocket gopher); G. bursarius (Plains pocket gopher, pictured); G. knoxjonesi (Knox Jones's pocket gopher); G. personatus (Texas pocket gopher); G. pinetis (Southeastern pocket gopher); G. texensis (Central Texas pocket gopher); G. tropicalis (Tropical pocket gopher)	South-central Canada, United States, and Mexico	Size range: 11 cm (4 in) long, plus 5 cm (2 in) tail (Knox Jones's pocket gopher) to 28 cm (11 in) long, plus 12 cm (5 in) tail (Texas pocket gopher) Habitats: Grassland, shrubland, savanna, forest, and desert Diets: Roots, rhizomes, and bulbs, as well as other vegetation
Heterogeomys (pocket gopher)	Le Conte, 1852 Three species: H. cherriei (Cherrie's pocket gopher); H. dariensis (Darien pocket gopher); H. lanius (Big pocket gopher)	Central America and Central Mexico	Size range: 18 cm (7 in) long, plus 8 cm (3 in) tail (Cherrie's pocket gopher) to 29 cm (11 in) long, plus 10 cm (4 in) tail (big pocket gopher) Habitats: Forest Diets: A variety of vegetation
Orthogeomys (taltuza)	Merriam, 1895 Six species: O. cavator (Chiriqui pocket gopher); O. cuniculus (Oaxacan pocket gopher); O. grandis (Giant pocket gopher); O. heterodus (Variable pocket gopher); O. hispidus (Hispid pocket gopher, pictured); O. underwoodi (Underwood's pocket gopher)	Mexico and Central America	Size range: 18 cm (7 in) long, plus 8 cm (3 in) tail (Underwood's pocket gopher) to 30 cm (12 in) long, plus 14 cm (6 in) tail (giant pocket gopher) Habitats: Intertidal marine, forest, and grassland Diets: A variety of vegetation
Pappogeomys	Merriam, 1895 One species: P. bulleri (Buller's pocket gopher)	Western-central Mexico	Size: 12–18 cm (5–7 in) long, plus 6–10 cm (2–4 in) tail Habitats: Forest, shrubland, and grassland Diet: Roots and other vegetation
Thomomys (smooth-toothed pocket gopher)	Wied-Neuwied, 1839 Nine species: T. bottae (Botta's pocket gopher, pictured); T. bulbivorus (Camas pocket gopher); T. clusius (Wyoming pocket gopher); T. idahoensis (Idaho pocket gopher); T. mazama (Mazama pocket gopher); T. monticola (Mountain pocket gopher); T. talpoides (Northern pocket gopher); T. townsendii (Townsend's pocket gopher); T. umbrinus (Southern pocket gopher)	Southwestern Canada, western United States, and northern Mexico	Size range: 8 cm (3 in) long, plus 5 cm (2 in) tail (Botta's pocket gopher) to 24 cm (9 in) long, plus 10 cm (4 in) tail (Camas pocket gopher) Habitats: Inland wetlands, grassland, shrubland, savanna, forest, and desert Diets: Roots, bulbs, leaves, and other vegetation
Zygogeomys	Merriam, 1895 One species: Z. trichopus (Michoacan pocket gopher)	Central Mexico	Size: 17–24 cm (7–9 in) long, plus 6–10 cm (2–4 in) tail Habitats: Forest Diet: Roots and rhizomes

===== Family Heteromyidae =====
Members of the Heteromyidae family are called heteromyids and include kangaroo rats, kangaroo mice, pocket mice, and spiny pocket mice. They primarily eat seeds, leaves, and other vegetation, as well as grain and insects. Heteromyidae comprises 63 extant species in 5 genera. These genera are divided between three subfamilies: Dipodomyinae, containing the kangaroo rats and kangaroo mice; Heteromyinae, or the spiny pocket mice; and Perognathinae, or the pocket mice.

Subfamily Dipodomyinae – Gervais, 1853 – two genera
Name	Authority and species	Range	Size and ecology
Dipodomys (kangaroo rat)	Gray, 1841 20 species: D. agilis (Agile kangaroo rat); D. californicus (California kangaroo rat); D. compactus (Gulf Coast kangaroo rat); D. deserti (Desert kangaroo rat); D. elator (Texas kangaroo rat); D. gravipes (San Quintin kangaroo rat); D. heermanni (Heermann's kangaroo rat, pictured); D. ingens (Giant kangaroo rat); D. merriami (Merriam's kangaroo rat); D. microps (Chisel-toothed kangaroo rat); D. nelsoni (Nelson's kangaroo rat); D. nitratoides (Fresno kangaroo rat); D. ordii (Ord's kangaroo rat); D. ornatus (Ornate kangaroo rat); D. panamintinus (Panamint kangaroo rat); D. phillipsii (Phillips's kangaroo rat); D. simulans (Dulzura kangaroo rat); D. spectabilis (Banner-tailed kangaroo rat); D. stephensi (Stephens's kangaroo rat); D. venustus (Narrow-faced kangaroo rat)	Southern Canada, western United States, and Mexico	Size range: 7 cm (3 in) long, plus 13 cm (5 in) tail (Fresno kangaroo rat) to 16 cm (6 in) long, plus 21 cm (8 in) tail (desert kangaroo rat) Habitats: Rocky areas, shrubland, savanna, grassland, coastal marine, desert, and forest Diets: Seeds, as well as fruit, leaves, stems, buds, and insects
Microdipodops (kangaroo mouse)	Merriam, 1891 Two species: M. megacephalus (Dark kangaroo mouse); M. pallidus (Pale kangaroo mouse, pictured)	Western United States	Size range: 7 cm (3 in) long, plus 6 cm (2 in) tail to 7 cm (3 in) long, plus 11 cm (4 in) tail (dark kangaroo mouse) Habitats: Desert and shrubland Diets: Grains and insects

Subfamily Heteromyinae – Gray, 1868 – one genus
Name	Authority and species	Range	Size and ecology
Heteromys (spiny pocket mouse)	Desmarest, 1817 Fourteen species: H. adspersus (Panamanian spiny pocket mouse); H. anomalus (Trinidad spiny pocket mouse); H. australis (Southern spiny pocket mouse); H. catopterius (Overlook spiny pocket mouse); H. desmarestianus (Desmarest's spiny pocket mouse); H. gaumeri (Gaumer's spiny pocket mouse); H. irroratus (Mexican spiny pocket mouse); H. nelsoni (Nelson's spiny pocket mouse, pictured); H. oasicus (Paraguaná spiny pocket mouse); H. oresterus (Mountain spiny pocket mouse); H. pictus (Painted spiny pocket mouse); H. salvini (Salvin's spiny pocket mouse); H. spectabilis (Jaliscan spiny pocket mouse); H. teleus (Ecuadoran spiny pocket mouse)	Southern United States, Mexico, Central America, and northeastern South America	Size range: 10 cm (4 in) long, plus 12 cm (5 in) tail (Jaliscan spiny pocket mouse) to 17 cm (7 in) long, plus 20 cm (8 in) tail (Nelson's spiny pocket mouse) Habitats: Shrubland and forest Diets: Seeds, leaves, twigs, and succulent plants

Subfamily Perognathinae – Coues, 1875 – two genera
Name	Authority and species	Range	Size and ecology
Chaetodipus (coarse-haired pocket mouse)	Merriam, 1889 Eighteen species: C. ammophilus (Dalquest's pocket mouse); C. arenarius (Little desert pocket mouse); C. artus (Narrow-skulled pocket mouse); C. baileyi (Bailey's pocket mouse); C. californicus (California pocket mouse); C. eremicus (Chihuahuan pocket mouse, pictured); C. fallax (San Diego pocket mouse); C. formosus (Long-tailed pocket mouse); C. goldmani (Goldman's pocket mouse); C. hispidus (Hispid pocket mouse); C. intermedius (Rock pocket mouse); C. lineatus (Lined pocket mouse); C. nelsoni (Nelson's pocket mouse); C. penicillatus (Desert pocket mouse); C. pernix (Sinaloan pocket mouse); C. rudinoris (Baja pocket mouse); C. siccus (Cerralvo Island pocket mouse); C. spinatus (Spiny pocket mouse)	United States and Mexico	Size range: 6 cm (2 in) long, plus 8 cm (3 in) tail (little desert pocket mouse) to 12 cm (5 in) long, plus 12 cm (5 in) tail (Hispid pocket mouse) Habitats: Rocky areas, shrubland, grassland, desert, and forest Diets: Seeds, as well as vegetation and insects
Perognathus (silky pocket mouse)	Wied-Neuwied, 1839 Nine species: P. alticolus (White-eared pocket mouse); P. amplus (Arizona pocket mouse); P. fasciatus (Olive-backed pocket mouse); P. flavescens (Plains pocket mouse, pictured); P. flavus (Silky pocket mouse); P. inornatus (San Joaquin pocket mouse); P. longimembris (Little pocket mouse); P. merriami (Merriam's pocket mouse); P. parvus (Great Basin pocket mouse)	Southern Canada, United States, and Mexico	Size range: 5 cm (2 in) long, plus 4 cm (2 in) tail (Merriam's pocket mouse) to 8 cm (3 in) long, plus 9 cm (4 in) tail (white-eared pocket mouse) Habitats: Desert, shrubland, savanna, grassland, and forest Diets: Seeds, as well as vegetation and insects

=== Suborder Hystricomorpha ===
==== Parvorder Caviomorpha ====
===== Superfamily Cavioidea =====
====== Family Caviidae ======
Members of the Caviidae family are called caviids and include guinea pigs, cavies, maras, and capybaras. They are herbivores and eat a wide variety of vegetation, primarily grass and leaves. Caviidae comprises 21 extant species which are divided into 6 genera in 3 subfamilies: Caviinae, containing the guinea pigs and cavies; Dolichotinae, containing the maras; and Hydrochoerinae, containing rock cavies and capybaras.

Subfamily Caviinae – Fischer de Waldheim, 1817 – three genera
Name	Authority and species	Range	Size and ecology
Cavia (guinea pig)	Pallas, 1766 Seven species: C. aperea (Brazilian guinea pig); C. fulgida (Shiny guinea pig); C. intermedia (Santa Catarina's guinea pig); C. magna (Greater guinea pig); C. patzelti (Sacha guinea pig); C. porcellus (Guinea pig, pictured); C. tschudii (Montane guinea pig)	South America (guinea pig domesticated worldwide)	Size range: 20 cm (8 in) long, with no tail (guinea pig) to 39 cm (15 in) long, with no tail (Brazilian guinea pig) Habitats: Grassland, forest, rocky areas, savanna, and inland wetlands Diets: Wide variety of vegetation
Galea (yellow-toothed cavy)	Meyen, 1832 Five species: G. comes (Southern highland yellow-toothed cavy); G. flavidens (Brazilian yellow-toothed cavy); G. leucoblephara (Lowland yellow-toothed cavy); G. musteloides (Common yellow-toothed cavy, pictured); G. spixii (Spix's yellow-toothed cavy)	South America	Size range: 19 cm (7 in) long, with no tail (lowland yellow-toothed cavy) to 24 cm (9 in) long, with no tail (southern highland yellow-toothed cavy) Habitats: Savanna, rocky areas, shrubland, and grassland Diets: Grass, forbs, and other vegetation
Microcavia (mountain cavy)	Gervais & Ameghino, 1880 Three species: M. australis (Southern mountain cavy, pictured); M. niata (Andean mountain cavy); M. shiptoni (Shipton's mountain cavy)	Southern and western South America	Size range: 19–20 cm (7–8 in) long, with no tail (Andean mountain cavy) Habitats: Desert, grassland, forest, rocky areas, savanna, and inland wetlands Diets: Leaves, as well as fruit

Subfamily Dolichotinae – Pocock, 1922 – one genus
Name	Authority and species	Range	Size and ecology
Dolichotis (mara)	Desmarest, 1820 Two species: D. patagonum (Patagonian mara, pictured); D. salinicola (Chacoan mara)	Southern and western South America	Size range: 42 cm (17 in) long, plus 1 cm (0.4 in) tail (Chacoan mara) to 80 cm (31 in) long, plus 4 cm (2 in) tail (Patagonian mara) Habitats: Savanna, forest, shrubland, and grassland Diets: Wide variety of vegetation

Subfamily Hydrochoerinae – J. E. Gray, 1825 – two genera
Name	Authority and species	Range	Size and ecology
Hydrochoerus (capybara)	Brisson, 1762 Two species: H. hydrochaeris (Capybara, pictured); H. isthmius (Lesser capybara)	Northwestern South America and Panama and South America	Size range: 102 cm (40 in) long, plus 1 cm (0.4 in) tail (lesser capybara) to 134 cm (53 in) long, plus 2 cm (0.8 in) tail (capybara) Habitats: Forest, inland wetlands, and savanna Diets: Grass, as well as aquatic plants, grains, melons, and squashes
Kerodon (rock cavy)	F. Cuvier, 1825 Two species: K. acrobata (Acrobatic cavy); K. rupestris (Rock cavy, pictured)	Eastern Brazil	Size range: 30 cm (12 in) long, with no tail (rock cavy) to 38 cm (15 in) long, with no tail (acrobatic cavy) Habitats: Forest, rocky areas, and savanna Diets: Leaves, flowers, buds, bark, and occasionally fruit

====== Family Cuniculidae ======
Members of the Cuniculidae family are called cuniculids or pacas. It contains two species, which eat leaves, stems, roots, seeds, and fruit.

Not assigned to a named subfamily – one genus
Name	Authority and species	Range	Size and ecology
Cuniculus (paca)	Brisson, 1762 Two species: C. paca (Lowland paca, pictured); C. taczanowskii (Mountain paca)	Mexico, Cuba, Central America, and South America	Size range: 50 cm (20 in) long, plus 1 cm (0.4 in) tail (lowland paca) to 80 cm (31 in) long, plus 3 cm (1 in) tail (mountain paca) Habitats: Forest and inland wetlands Diets: Leaves, stems, roots, seeds, and fruit

====== Family Dasyproctidae ======
Members of the Dasyproctidae family are called dasyproctids and include agoutis and acouchis. They are herbivores and primarily eat fruit, vegetables, and succulent plants. Dasyproctidae comprises fifteen extant species which are divided into two genera.

Not assigned to a named subfamily – two genera
Name	Authority and species	Range	Size and ecology
Dasyprocta (agouti)	Bonaparte, 1838 Thirteen species: D. azarae (Azara's agouti); D. coibae (Coiban agouti); D. croconota (Orange agouti); D. fuliginosa (Black agouti); D. guamara (Orinoco agouti); D. iacki (Iack's red-rumped agouti); D. kalinowskii (Kalinowski's agouti); D. leporina (Red-rumped agouti); D. mexicana (Mexican agouti); D. prymnolopha (Black-rumped agouti); D. punctata (Central American agouti, pictured); D. ruatanica (Ruatan Island agouti); D. variegata (Brown agouti)	Mexico, Cuba, Central America, and South America (in red)	Size range: 43 cm (17 in) long, plus 1 cm (0.4 in) tail (Azara's agouti) to 76 cm (30 in) long, plus 4 cm (2 in) tail (black agouti) Habitats: Savanna and forest Diets: Fruit, seeds, vegetables, and succulent plants, as well as crabs
Myoprocta (achouchi)	Thomas, 1903 Two species: M. acouchy (Red acouchi); M. pratti (Green acouchi, pictured)	Northern South America (in blue)	Size range: 30 cm (12 in) long, plus 4 cm (2 in) tail (green acouchi) to 39 cm (15 in) long, plus 8 cm (3 in) tail (red acouchi) Habitats: Forest Diets: Fruit, seeds, vegetables, and succulent plants

===== Superfamily Chinchilloidea =====
====== Family Chinchillidae ======
Members of the Chinchillidae family are called chinchillids and contain chinchillas and viscachas. They are herbivores and eat grass and seeds, as well as other vegetation. Chinchillidae comprises six extant species which are divided into three genera, as well as a single extinct species.

Not assigned to a named subfamily – three genera
Name	Authority and species	Range	Size and ecology
Chinchilla (chinchilla)	Bennett, 1829 Two species: C. chinchilla (Short-tailed chinchilla); C. lanigera (Long-tailed chinchilla, pictured)	Western South America	Size range: 22 cm (9 in) long, plus 14 cm (6 in) tail (long-tailed chinchilla) to 38 cm (15 in) long, plus 10 cm (4 in) tail (short-tailed chinchilla) Habitats: Grassland, shrubland, and rocky areas Diets: A wide variety of vegetation
Lagidium (viscacha)	Meyen, 1833 Three species: L. ahuacaense (Ecuadorean viscacha); L. viscacia (Southern viscacha, pictured); L. wolffsohni (Wolffsohn's viscacha)	Western and southern South America	Size range: 29 cm (11 in) long, plus 31 cm (12 in) tail (southern viscacha) to 48 cm (19 in) long, plus 31 cm (12 in) tail (Wolffsohn's viscacha) Habitats: Rocky areas Diets: A wide variety of vegetation, as well as lichen and moss
Lagostomus (plains viscacha)	Brookes, 1828 Two species: L. crassus † (Peruvian plains viscacha); L. maximus (Plains viscacha, pictured)	Southern South America	Size range: 39–61 cm (15–24 in) long, plus 13–20 cm (5–8 in) tail (plains viscacha) Habitats: Savanna, grassland, and desert Diets: Grass and seeds, as well as other vegetation

====== Family Dinomyidae ======
Members of the Dinomyidae family are called dinomyids. It contains a single species, which eats fruit, leaves, and stems.

Not assigned to a named subfamily – one genus
Name	Authority and species	Range	Size and ecology
Dinomys	Peters, 1873 One species: D. branickii (Pacarana)	Northwestern South America	Size: 73–79 cm (29–31 in) long, plus 14–23 cm (6–9 in) tail (pacarana) Habitats: Forest and grassland Diet: Fruit, leaves, and stems

===== Superfamily Erethizontoidea =====
====== Family Erethizontidae ======
Members of the Erethizontidae family are called erethizontids or New World porcupines. They are herbivores and primarily eat leaves, stems, fruit, flowers, and roots. Erethizontidae comprises eighteen extant species in three genera, grouped into two subfamilies: Chaetomyinae, containing a single species, and Erethizontinae, containing the other seventeen.

Subfamily Chaetomyinae – Thomas, 1897 – one genus
Name	Authority and species	Range	Size and ecology
Chaetomys	J. E Gray, 1843 One species: C. subspinosus (Bristle-spined rat)	Eastern Brazil	Size: 36–45 cm (14–18 in) long, plus 26–27 cm (10–11 in) tail Habitats: Forest Diet: Nuts

Subfamily Erethizontinae – Bonaparte, 1845 – two genera
Name	Authority and species	Range	Size and ecology
Coendou (prehensile-tailed porcupine)	Lacépède, 1799 Sixteen species: C. baturitensis (Baturite porcupine); C. bicolor (Bicolored-spined porcupine); C. ichillus (Streaked dwarf porcupine); C. insidiosus (Bahia porcupine); C. melanurus (Black-tailed hairy dwarf porcupine); C. mexicanus (Mexican hairy dwarf porcupine); C. nycthemera (Black dwarf porcupine); C. prehensilis (Brazilian porcupine); C. pruinosus (Frosted hairy dwarf porcupine); C. quichua (Andean porcupine); C. roosmalenorum (Roosmalen's dwarf porcupine); C. rothschildi (Rothschild's porcupine); C. rufescens (Stump-tailed porcupine); C. speratus (Dwarf porcupine); C. spinosus (Paraguaian hairy dwarf porcupine, pictured); C. vestitus (Brown hairy dwarf porcupine)	Mexico, Central America, and South America	Size range: 24 cm (9 in) long, plus 20 cm (8 in) tail (Paraguaian hairy dwarf porcupine) to 55 cm (22 in) long, plus 47 cm (19 in) tail (Baturite porcupine) Habitats: Forest and savanna Diets: Leaves, stems, fruit, flowers, and roots
Erethizon	F. Cuvier, 1823 One species: E. dorsatum (North American porcupine)	North America	Size: 60–130 cm (24–51 in) long, plus 16–25 cm (6–10 in) tail Habitats: Forest, shrubland, and grassland Diet: Buds, twigs, roots, stems, leaves, flowers, seeds, berries, nuts, and other vegetation

===== Superfamily Octodontoidea =====
====== Family Abrocomidae ======
Members of the Abrocomidae family are called abrocomids or chinchilla rats. They are herbivores and eat a variety of vegetation. Abrocomidae comprises ten extant species which are divided into two genera.

Not assigned to a named subfamily – two genera
Name	Authority and species	Range	Size and ecology
Abrocoma (chinchilla rat)	Waterhouse, 1837 Eight species: A. bennettii (Bennett's chinchilla rat, pictured); A. boliviensis (Bolivian chinchilla rat); A. budini (Budin's chinchilla rat); A. cinerea (Ashy chinchilla rat); A. famatina (Famatina chinchilla rat); A. schistacea (Sierra del Tontal chinchilla rat); A. uspallata (Uspallata chinchilla rat); A. vaccarum (Punta de Vacas chinchilla rat)	Western South America (in red)	Size range: 15 cm (6 in) long, plus 5 cm (2 in) tail (ashy chinchilla rat) to 23 cm (9 in) long, plus 28 cm (11 in) tail (Bennett's chinchilla rat) Habitats: Shrubland, inland wetlands, forest, rocky areas, grassland, and savanna Diets: A variety of vegetation
Cuscomys (arboreal chinchilla rat)	Emmons, 1999 Two species: C. ashaninka (Asháninka arboreal chinchilla rat); C. oblativus (Machu Picchu arboreal chinchilla rat, pictured)	Peru	Size range: About 35 cm (14 in) long, plus about 26 cm (10 in) tail (Asháninka arboreal chinchilla rat) Habitats: Forest Diets: A variety of vegetation

====== Family Capromyidae ======
Members of the Capromyidae family are called capromyids or hutias. They are omnivores and eat leaves, fruit, bark, and small animals. Capromyidae comprises ten extant species in five genera, grouped into two subfamilies: Capromyinae, containing nine species, and Plagiodontinae, containing a single species. Additionally, two species in Capromyinae, three species in Plagiodontinae, the sole species in the subfamily Hexolobodontinae, and the two species in the subfamily Isolobodontinae were driven extinct after 1500 due to the European colonization of the Americas and introduction of non-native rats, with some species surviving until the 1900s.

Subfamily Capromyinae – Smith, 1842 – four genera
Name	Authority and species	Range	Size and ecology
Capromys	Desmarest, 1822 One species: C. pilorides (Desmarest's hutia)	Cuba	Size: 30–62 cm (12–24 in) long, plus 13–31 cm (5–12 in) tail Habitats: Forest and caves Diet: Leaves, fruit, bark, lizards, and other small animals
Geocapromys (Bahamian and Jamaican hutia)	Chapman, 1901 Four species: G. brownii (Jamaican coney, pictured); G. columbianus † (Cuban coney); G. ingrahami (Bahamian hutia); G. thoracatus † (Little Swan Island hutia)	Caribbean	Size range: 28 cm (11 in) long, plus 6 cm (2 in) tail (Bahamian hutia) to 45 cm (18 in) long, plus 7 cm (3 in) tail (Jamaican coney) Habitats: Shrubland, intertidal marine, forest, and rocky areas Diets: Bark, twigs, and leaves
Mesocapromys (small Cuban hutia)	Varona, 1970 Five species: M. angelcabrerai (Cabrera's hutia, pictured); M. auritus (Eared hutia); M. melanurus (Black-tailed hutia); M. nanus (Dwarf hutia); M. sanfelipensis (San Felipe hutia)	Cuba	Size range: 20 cm (8 in) long, plus 17 cm (7 in) tail (Dwarf hutia) to 38 cm (15 in) long, plus 32 cm (13 in) tail (Black-tailed hutia) Habitats: Inland wetlands and forest Diets: Vegetation and small animals
Mysateles	Lesson, 1842 One species: M. prehensilis (Prehensile-tailed hutia)	Western Cuba	Size: 33–45 cm (13–18 in) long, plus 25–35 cm (10–14 in) tail Habitats: Forest Diet: Leaves

Subfamily Hexolobodontinae † – Woods, 1989 – one genus
Name	Authority and species	Range	Size and ecology
Hexolobodon †	Miller, 1929 One species: H. phenax † (Imposter hutia)	Hispaniola	Size: Unknown Habitats: Unknown Diet: Unknown

Subfamily Isolobodontinae † – Woods, 1989 – one genus
Name	Authority and species	Range	Size and ecology
Isolobodon † (laminar-toothed hutia)	J. A. Allen, 1916 Two species: I. montanus † (Montane hutia); I. portoricensis † (Puerto Rican hutia, pictured)	Hispaniola, Puerto Rico, and nearby islands	Size range: Unknown Habitats: Forest Diets: Unknown

Subfamily Plagiodontinae – Ellerman, 1940 – three genera
Name	Authority and species	Range	Size and ecology
Hyperplagiodontia †	Rímoli, 1977 One species: H. araeum † (Wide-toothed hutia)	Hispaniola	Size: Unknown Habitats: Unknown Diet: Bark, leaves, and tree buds
Plagiodontia (Hispaniolan hutia)	F. Cuvier, 1836 Two species: P. aedium (Hispaniolan hutia); P. ipnaeum † (Samaná hutia)	Hispaniola	Size range: 31–40 cm (12–16 in) long, plus 12–16 cm (5–6 in) tail (Hispaniolan hutia) Habitats: Rocky areas, and forest Diets: Bark, leaves, and tree buds
Rhizoplagiodontia †	Woods, 1989 One species: R. lemkei † (Lemke's hutia)	Hispaniola	Size: Unknown Habitats: Unknown Diet: Unknown

====== Family Ctenomyidae ======
Members of the Ctenomyidae family are called ctenomyids or tuco-tucos. They are herbivores and eat a wide variety of vegetation. Ctenomyidae comprises 61 extant species in a single genus.

Not assigned to a named subfamily – one genus
Name	Authority and species	Range	Size and ecology
Ctenomys (tuco-tuco)	Blainville, 1826 61 species: C. argentinus (Argentine tuco-tuco); C. australis (Southern tuco-tuco); C. azarae (Azara's tuco-tuco); C. bergi (Berg's tuco-tuco); C. boliviensis (Bolivian tuco-tuco); C. bonettoi (Bonetto's tuco-tuco); C. brasiliensis (Brazilian tuco-tuco); C. colburni (Colburn's tuco-tuco); C. coludo (Puntilla tuco-tuco); C. conoveri (Conover's tuco-tuco); C. coyhaiquensis (Coyhaique tuco-tuco); C. dorbignyi (D'Orbigny's tuco-tuco); C. dorsalis (Chacoan tuco-tuco); C. emilianus (Emily's tuco-tuco); C. famosus (Famatina tuco-tuco); C. flamarioni (Flamarion's tuco-tuco); C. fochi (Foch's tuco-tuco); C. fodax (Lago Blanco tuco-tuco); C. frater (Reddish tuco-tuco); C. fulvus (Tawny tuco-tuco); C. goodfellowi (Goodfellow's tuco-tuco); C. haigi (Haig's tuco-tuco); C. ibicui (Ibicui tuco-tuco); C. johannis (San Juan tuco-tuco); C. juris (Jujuy tuco-tuco); C. knighti (Catamarca tuco-tuco); C. lami (Lami tuco-tuco); C. latro (Mottled tuco-tuco); C. leucodon (White-toothed tuco-tuco); C. lewisi (Lewis's tuco-tuco); C. magellanicus (Magellanic tuco-tuco); C. maulinus (Maule tuco-tuco); C. mendocinus (Mendoza tuco-tuco); C. minutus (Tiny tuco-tuco); C. occultus (Furtive tuco-tuco); C. opimus (Highland tuco-tuco); C. osvaldoreigi (Reig's tuco-tuco); C. pearsoni (Pearson's tuco-tuco); C. perrensi (Goya tuco-tuco); C. peruanus (Peruvian tuco-tuco); C. pilarensis (Pilar tuco-tuco); C. plebiscitum (Plebiscite tuco-tuco); C. pontifex (San Luis tuco-tuco); C. porteousi (Porteous's tuco-tuco); C. pundti (Pundt's tuco-tuco); C. rionegrensis (Rio Negro tuco-tuco); C. roigi (Roig's tuco-tuco); C. saltarius (Salta tuco-tuco); C. scagliai (Scaglia's tuco-tuco); C. sericeus (Silky tuco-tuco, pictured); C. sociabilis (Social tuco-tuco); C. steinbachi (Steinbach's tuco-tuco); C. talarum (Talas tuco-tuco); C. terraplen (Laguna Terraplén tuco-tuco); C. torquatus (Collared tuco-tuco); C. tuconax (Robust tuco-tuco); C. tucumanus (Tucuman tuco-tuco); C. tulduco (Sierra Tontal tuco-tuco); C. validus (Strong tuco-tuco); C. viperinus (Vipos tuco-tuco); C. yolandae (Yolanda's tuco-tuco)	Southern South America	Size range: 11 cm (4 in) long, plus 7 cm (3 in) tail (white-toothed tuco-tuco) to 33 cm (13 in) long, plus 14 cm (6 in) tail (Conover's tuco-tuco) Habitats: Forest, desert, grassland, inland wetlands, coastal marine, shrubland, and savanna Diets: A wide variety of vegetation

====== Family Echimyidae ======
Members of the Echimyidae family are called echimyids or Neotropical spiny rats, and include spiny rats, tree-rats, and cave rats. They primarily eat a wide variety of vegetation, though some species also eat insects. Echimyidae comprises 88 extant species in 23 genera, split into three subfamilies: Caterodontinae, containing a single species; Echimyinae, containing 75 species, and Euryzygomatomyinae, containing 12 species. Additionally, six species of Caribbean cave rat, comprising the three genera of the subfamily Heteropsomyinae, were driven to extinction since 1500 due to the European colonization of the Americas and introduction of non-native rats, with some species surviving until the 1900s.

Subfamily Carterodontinae – Courcelle, Tilak, Leite, Douzery, & Fabre, 2019 – one genus
Name	Authority and species	Range	Size and ecology
Carterodon	Waterhouse, 1848 One species: C. sulcidens (Owl's spiny rat)	Eastern Brazil	Size: 13–25 cm (5–10 in) long, plus 6–10 cm (2–4 in) tail Habitats: Forest and savanna Diet: Vegetation

Subfamily Echimyinae – Gray, 1825 – eighteen genera
Name	Authority and species	Range	Size and ecology
Callistomys	Emmons & Vucetich, 1998 One species: C. pictus (Painted tree-rat)	Eastern Brazil	Size: 25–29 cm (10–11 in) long, plus 27–32 cm (11–13 in) tail Habitats: Forest Diet: Vegetation
Dactylomys (bamboo rat)	Geoffroy, 1838 Three species: D. boliviensis (Bolivian bamboo rat); D. dactylinus (Amazon bamboo rat, pictured); D. peruanus (Montane bamboo rat)	Northern and western South America	Size range: 24 cm (9 in) long, plus 32 cm (13 in) tail (montane bamboo rat) to 31 cm (12 in) long, plus 39 cm (15 in) tail (Amazon bamboo rat) Habitats: Forest Diets: Bamboo and other plants
Diplomys (soft-furred spiny rat)	Thomas, 1916 Two species: D. caniceps (Colombian soft-furred spiny rat, pictured); D. labilis (Rufous soft-furred spiny rat)	Northwestern South America and Panama	Size range: 21–39 cm (8–15 in) long, plus 17–27 cm (7–11 in) tail (Colombian soft-furred spiny rat) Habitats: Forest Diets: Seeds and fruit
Echimys (spiny tree-rat)	F. Cuvier, 1809 Three species: E. chrysurus (White-faced spiny tree-rat, pictured); E. saturnus (Dark spiny tree-rat); E. vieirai (Vieira's tree-rat)	Northern South America	Size range: 24 cm (9 in) long, plus 34 cm (13 in) tail (Vieira's tree-rat) to 33 cm (13 in) long, plus 38 cm (15 in) tail (dark spiny tree-rat) Habitats: Forest Diets: Vegetation
Hoplomys	J. A. Allen, 1908 One species: H. gymnurus (Armored rat)	Central America and northwestern South America	Size: 21–32 cm (8–13 in) long, plus 11–24 cm (4–9 in) tail Habitats: Forest Diet: Wide variety of vegetation, as well as insects
Isothrix (brush-tailed rat)	Wagner, 1845 Six species: I. barbarabrownae (Barbara Brown's brush-tailed rat); I. bistriata (Yellow-crowned brush-tailed rat, pictured); I. negrensis (Rio Negro brush-tailed rat); I. orinoci (Orinoco brush-tailed rat); I. pagurus (Plain brush-tailed rat); I. sinnamariensis (Sinnamary brush-tailed rat)	Northern and western South America	Size range: 17 cm (7 in) long, plus 17 cm (7 in) tail (Plain brush-tailed rat) to 29 cm (11 in) long, plus 27 cm (11 in) tail (Rio Negro brush-tailed rat) Habitats: Forest and grassland Diets: Vegetation
Kannabateomys	Jentink, 1891 One species: K. amblyonyx (Atlantic bamboo rat)	Eastern South America	Size: 23–35 cm (9–14 in) long, plus 30–42 cm (12–17 in) tail Habitats: Forest Diet: Bamboo
Lonchothrix	Thomas, 1920 One species: L. emiliae (Tuft-tailed spiny tree-rat)	Northern Brazil	Size: 15–22 cm (6–9 in) long, plus 15–23 cm (6–9 in) tail Habitats: Forest and grassland Diet: Vegetation
Makalata (armored tree-rat)	Husson, 1978 Three species: M. didelphoides (Brazilian spiny tree-rat, pictured); M. macrura (Long-tailed armored tree-rat); M. obscura (Dusky spiny tree-rat)	Northern South America	Size range: 15 cm (6 in) long, plus 15 cm (6 in) tail (Brazilian spiny tree-rat) to 28 cm (11 in) long, plus 24 cm (9 in) tail (long-tailed armored tree-rat) Habitats: Forest Diets: Fruit and seeds
Mesomys (spiny tree-rat)	Wagner, 1845 Four species: M. hispidus (Ferreira's spiny tree-rat, pictured); M. leniceps (Woolly-headed spiny tree-rat); M. occultus (Tufted-tailed spiny tree-rat); M. stimulax (Pará spiny tree-rat)	Northern South America	Size range: 15–20 cm (6–8 in) long, plus 12–20 cm (5–8 in) tail (Pará spiny tree-rat) Habitats: Forest Diets: Vegetation
Myocastor	Kerr, 1792 One species: M. coypus (Nutria)	Southern South America, and introduced in United States, Europe, and Japan	Size: 47–57 cm (19–22 in) long, plus 34–40 cm (13–16 in) tail Habitats: Inland wetlands Diet: Roots and aquatic plants
Olallamys (olalla rat)	Emmons, 1988 Two species: O. albicauda (White-tailed olalla rat, pictured); O. edax (Greedy olalla rat)	Colombia and western Venezuela	Size range: 15 cm (6 in) long, plus 25 cm (10 in) tail (white-tailed olalla rat) to 22 cm (9 in) long, plus 34 cm (13 in) tail (greedy olalla rat) Habitats: Forest and shrubland Diets: Vegetation
Pattonomys (speckled tree-rat)	Emmons, 2005 Five species: P. carrikeri (Carriker's speckled tree-rat); P. flavidus (Yellow speckled tree-rat); P. occasius (Bare-tailed armored tree-rat); P. punctatus (Orinocoan speckled tree-rat); P. semivillosus (Speckled spiny tree-rat)	Colombia, Venezuela, and Ecuador	Size range: 20 cm (8 in) long, plus 21 cm (8 in) tail (speckled spiny tree-rat) to 27 cm (11 in) long, plus 23 cm (9 in) tail (Orinocoan speckled tree-rat) Habitats: Forest and savanna Diets: Vegetation
Phyllomys (Atlantic tree-rat)	Lund, 1839 Thirteen species: P. blainvillii (Golden Atlantic tree-rat); P. brasiliensis (Orange-brown Atlantic tree-rat); P. dasythrix (Drab Atlantic tree-rat); P. kerri (Kerr's Atlantic tree-rat); P. lamarum (Pallid Atlantic tree-rat); P. lundi (Lund's Atlantic tree-rat); P. mantiqueirensis (Mantiqueira Atlantic tree-rat); P. medius (Long-furred Atlantic tree-rat); P. nigrispinus (Black-spined Atlantic tree-rat); P. pattoni (Rusty-sided Atlantic tree-rat); P. sulinus (Southern Atlantic tree-rat); P. thomasi (Giant Atlantic tree-rat, pictured); P. unicolor (Short-furred Atlantic tree-rat)	Southern and eastern Brazil	Size range: 17 cm (7 in) long, plus 19 cm (7 in) tail (golden Atlantic tree-rat) to 30 cm (12 in) long, plus 34 cm (13 in) tail (giant Atlantic tree-rat) Habitats: Forest Diets: Vegetation
Proechimys (spiny rat)	Allen, 1899 22 species: P. brevicauda (Short-tailed spiny rat); P. canicollis (Colombian spiny rat); P. chrysaeolus (Boyacá spiny rat); P. cuvieri (Cuvier's spiny rat); P. decumanus (Pacific spiny rat); P. echinothrix (Stiff-spine spiny rat); P. gardneri (Gardner's spiny rat); P. goeldii (Goeldi's spiny rat); P. guairae (Guaira spiny rat); P. guyannensis (Guyenne spiny rat); P. hoplomyoides (Guyanan spiny-rat); P. kulinae (Kulina spiny rat); P. longicaudatus (Long-tailed spiny rat, pictured); P. mincae (Minca spiny rat); P. oconnelli (O'Connell's spiny rat); P. pattoni (Patton's spiny rat); P. quadruplicatus (Napo spiny rat); P. roberti (Robert's spiny rat); P. semispinosus (Tome's spiny rat); P. simonsi (Simons's spiny rat); P. steerei (Steere's spiny rat); P. trinitatus (Trinidad spiny rat)	Central America and Northern and western South America	Size range: 14 cm (6 in) long, plus 9 cm (4 in) tail (Kulina spiny rat) to 30 cm (12 in) long, plus 20 cm (8 in) tail (Pacific spiny rat) Habitats: Forest and savanna Diets: Wide variety of vegetation
Santamartamys	Emmons, 2005 One species: S. rufodorsalis (Red-crested tree-rat)	Northern Colombia	Size: About 19 cm (7 in) Habitats: Unknown Diet: Seeds and fruit
Thrichomys (punaré)	Trouessart, 1880 Four species: T. apereoides (Common punaré, pictured); T. inermis (Highlands punaré); T. laurentius (Sao Lourenço punaré); T. pachyurus (Paraguayan punaré)	Southern and eastern Brazil	Size range: 12–24 cm (5–9 in) long, plus 13–21 cm (5–8 in) tail (Sao Lourenço punaré) Habitats: Forest, rocky areas, savanna, and shrubland Diets: Seeds, fruit, cacti, and insects
Toromys (giant tree-rat)	Iack-Ximenes, Vivo, & Percequillo, 2005 Two species: T. grandis (Giant tree-rat); T. rhipidura (Peruvian toro)	Northern Brazil and Peru	Size range: 21 cm (8 in) long, plus 18 cm (7 in) tail (Peruvian toro) to 30 cm (12 in) long, plus 28 cm (11 in) tail (giant tree-rat) Habitats: Forest Diets: Vegetation

Subfamily Euryzygomatomyinae – Fabre, Upham, Emmons, Justy, Leite, Loss, Orlando, Tilak, Patterson, & Douzery, 2017 – three genera
Name	Authority and species	Range	Size and ecology
Clyomys	Thomas, 1916 One species: C. laticeps (Broad-headed spiny rat)	Paraguay and southern Brazil	Size: 15–29 cm (6–11 in) long, plus 4–9 cm (2–4 in) tail Habitats: Savanna Diet: Vegetation
Euryzygomatomys	Goeldi, 1901 One species: E. spinosus (Fischer's guiara)	Southern Brazil and northeastern Argentina	Size: 16–20 cm (6–8 in) long, plus 6–7 cm (2–3 in) tail Habitats: Forest and grassland Diet: Vegetation
Trinomys (Atlantic spiny rat)	Thomas, 1921 Ten species: T. albispinus (White-spined Atlantic spiny rat); T. dimidiatus (Soft-spined Atlantic spiny rat); T. eliasi (Elias's Atlantic spiny rat); T. gratiosus (Gracile Atlantic spiny rat); T. iheringi (Ihering's Atlantic spiny rat); T. mirapitanga (Dark-caped Atlantic spiny rat); T. moojeni (Moojen's Atlantic spiny rat); T. paratus (Spiked Atlantic spiny rat); T. setosus (Hairy Atlantic spiny rat); T. yonenagae (Yonenaga's Atlantic spiny rat)	Eastern Brazil	Size range: 14 cm (6 in) long, plus 16 cm (6 in) tail (Yonenaga's Atlantic spiny rat) to 27 cm (11 in) long, plus 23 cm (9 in) tail (spiked Atlantic spiny rat) Habitats: Forest, savanna, rocky areas, grassland, and shrubland Diets: Wide variety of vegetation

Subfamily Heteropsomyinae † – Anthony, 1917 – three genera
Name	Authority and species	Range	Size and ecology
Boromys † (Cuban cave rat)	Miller, 1916 Two species: B. offella † (Oriente cave rat); B. torrei † (Torre's cave rat)	Cuba	Size range: Unknown Habitats: Unknown Diets: Unknown
Brotomys † (edible rat)	Miller, 1916 Two species: B. contractus † (Haitian edible rat); B. voratus † (Hispaniolan edible rat)	Dominican Republic and Haiti	Size range: Unknown Habitats: Unknown Diets: Unknown
Heteropsomys † (Puerto Rican cave rat)	Anthony, 1916 Two species: H. antillensis † (Antillean cave rat); H. insulans † (Insular cave rat)	Puerto Rico	Size range: Unknown Habitats: Unknown Diets: Unknown

====== Family Octodontidae ======
Members of the Octodontidae family are called octodontids and include degus, rock rats, and viscacha rats. They are herbivores, and eat a variety of plant matter and fruit, with some species also eating dung. Octodontidae comprises fourteen extant species in seven genera.

Not assigned to a named subfamily – seven genera
Name	Authority and species	Range	Size and ecology
Aconaemys (rock rat)	Ameghino, 1891 Three species: A. fuscus (Chilean rock rat, pictured); A. porteri (Porter's rock rat); A. sagei (Sage's rock rat)	Chile and western Argentina	Size range: 14–20 cm (6–8 in) long, plus 6–9 cm (2–4 in) tail (Porter's rock rat) Habitats: Rocky areas and forest Diets: Roots, fruit, and other vegetation
Octodon (degu)	Bennett, 1823 Four species: O. bridgesii (Bridges's degu); O. degus (Common degu, pictured); O. lunatus (Moon-toothed degu); O. pacificus (Pacific degu)	Central Chile and western Argentina	Size range: 12 cm (5 in) long, plus 16 cm (6 in) tail (Pacific degu) to 22 cm (9 in) long, plus 17 cm (7 in) tail (moon-toothed degu) Habitats: Rocky areas, forest, and shrubland Diets: Grass, leaves, bark, herbs, seeds, and fruit, as well as dung
Octodontomys	Palmer, 1903 One species: O. gliroides (Mountain degu)	Western South America	Size: 16–19 cm (6–7 in) long, plus 10–19 cm (4–7 in) tail Habitats: Shrubland, grassland, and rocky areas Diet: Acacia seed pods and cactus fruits
Octomys	Thomas, 1920 One species: O. mimax (Mountain viscacha rat)	Western Argentina	Size: 14–33 cm (6–13 in) long, plus 10–18 cm (4–7 in) tail Habitats: Rocky areas Diet: Roots, bark, and cactus
Pipanacoctomys	Mares, Braun, Barquez, & Díaz, 2000 One species: P. aureus (Golden viscacha rat)	Northwestern Argentina	Size: 16–18 cm (6–7 in) long, plus 12–15 cm (5–6 in) tail Habitats: Inland wetlands Diet: Leaves and stems
Spalacopus	Wagler, 1832 One species: S. cyanus (Coruro)	Central Chile	Size: 11–17 cm (4–7 in) long, plus 4–6 cm (2 in) tail Habitats: Forest, savanna and grassland Diet: Tubers and stems of Leucocoryne and other plants
Tympanoctomys (viscacha rat)	Yepes, 1942 Three species: T. barrerae (Plains viscacha rat, pictured); T. kirchnerorum (Kirchner's viscacha rat); T. loschalchalerosorum (Chalchalero viscacha rat)	Argentina	Size range: 11 cm (4 in) long, plus 11 cm (4 in) tail (Kirchner's viscacha rat) to 16 cm (6 in) long, plus 12 cm (5 in) tail (Chalchalero viscacha rat) Habitats: Grassland, shrubland, shrublands, and inland wetlands Diets: Leaves and stems

==== Superfamily Ctenodactyloidea ====
===== Family Ctenodactylidae =====
Members of the Ctenodactylidae family are called ctenodactylids or gundis. They eat a variety of vegetation. Ctenodactylidae comprises five extant species in four genera.

Not assigned to a named subfamily – four genera
Name	Authority and species	Range	Size and ecology
Ctenodactylus (gundi)	J. E. Gray, 1830 Two species: C. gundi (Common gundi); C. vali (Val's gundi, pictured)	Northwestern Africa	Size range: 12 cm (5 in) long, plus 2 cm (0.8 in) tail (Val's gundi) to 23 cm (9 in) long, plus 5 cm (2 in) tail (common gundi) Habitats: Shrubland and rocky areas Diets: Vegetation
Felovia	Lastaste, 1886 One species: F. vae (Felou gundi)	Western Africa	Size: 16–19 cm (6–7 in) long, plus 6–8 cm (2–3 in) tail Habitats: Savanna, shrubland, and rocky areas Diet: Vegetation
Massoutiera	Lastaste, 1885 One species: M. mzabi (Mzab gundi)	Northwestern Africa	Size: 12–21 cm (5–8 in) long, plus 3–9 cm (1–4 in) tail Habitats: Rocky areas Diet: Leaves, stems, seeds, and flowers
Pectinator	Blyth, 1856 One species: P. spekei (Speke's pectinator)	Eastern Africa	Size: 15–19 cm (6–7 in) long, plus 6–8 cm (2–3 in) tail Habitats: Shrubland, grassland, and rocky areas Diet: Leaves, stems, seeds, and flowers

===== Family Diatomyidae =====
Members of the Diatomyidae family are called diatomyids. The family contains a single herbivorous species.

Not assigned to a named subfamily – one genus
Name	Authority and species	Range	Size and ecology
Laonastes	Jenkins, Kilpatrick, Robinson, & Timmins, 2005 One species: L. aenigmamus (Laotian rock rat)	Laos and Vietnam	Size: 21–30 cm (8–12 in) long, plus 12–17 cm (5–7 in) tail Habitats: Forest and rocky areas Diet: Grass, seeds, and other vegetation

==== Family Hystricidae ====
Members of the Hystricidae family are called hystricids or Old World porcupines. They are primarily herbivores and eat grasses, bulbs, tubers, fruit, bark, and roots, though insects and carrion are occasionally eaten. Hystricidae comprises eleven extant species in three genera.

Not assigned to a named subfamily – three genera
Name	Authority and species	Range	Size and ecology
Atherurus (brush-tailed porcupine)	F. Cuvier, 1829 Two species: A. africanus (African brush-tailed porcupine); A. macrourus (Asiatic brush-tailed porcupine, pictured)	Southeast Asia, southern China and Central Africa (outlined in blue)	Size range: 36–60 cm (14–24 in) long, plus 10–26 cm (4–10 in) tail (African brush-tailed porcupine) Habitats: Forest and shrubland Diets: Vegetation, bark, roots, tubers, and fruit, as well as cultivated crops, insects, and carrion
Hystrix (Old World porcupine)	Linnaeus, 1758 Eight species: H. africaeaustralis (Cape porcupine); H. brachyura (Malayan porcupine); H. crassispinis (Thick-spined porcupine); H. cristata (Crested porcupine); H. indica (Indian crested porcupine, pictured); H. javanica (Sunda porcupine); H. pumila (Philippine porcupine); H. sumatrae (Sumatran porcupine)	Africa, Italy, and Asia (solid colors)	Size range: 45–93 cm (18–37 in) long, plus 6–17 cm (2–7 in) tail (crested porcupine) Habitats: Forest, grassland, shrubland, rocky areas, and savanna Diets: Bark, roots, tubers, rhizomes, bulbs, fruit, and cultivated crops, as well as carrion, insects, and small vertebrates
Trichys	Günther, 1877 One species: T. fasciculata (Long-tailed porcupine)	Brunei, Indonesia, and Malaysia	Size: 35–48 cm (14–19 in) long, plus 17–24 cm (7–9 in) tail Habitats: Forest Diet: Seeds, vegetation from trees, shrubs, and bamboo

==== Parvorder Phiomorpha ====
===== Family Bathyergidae =====
Members of the Bathyergidae family are called bathyergids, blesmols, or mole-rats. They are omnivores, and primarily eat roots, bulbs, and tubers, as well as earthworms and insects. Bathyergidae comprises twenty-one extant species in five genera.

Not assigned to a named subfamily – five genera
Name	Authority and species	Range	Size and ecology
Bathyergus (dune mole-rat)	Illiger, 1811 Two species: B. janetta (Namaqua dune mole-rat); B. suillus (Cape dune mole-rat, pictured)	South Africa and Namibia	Size range: 17 cm (7 in) long, plus 4 cm (2 in) tail (Namaqua dune mole-rat) to 35 cm (14 in) long, plus 4 cm (2 in) tail (Cape dune mole-rat) Habitats: Desert and shrubland Diets: Bulbs and fleshy roots
Cryptomys (common mole-rat)	Gray, 1864 Four species: C. hottentotus (Common mole-rat, pictured); C. mahali (Mahali mole-rat); C. natalensis (Natal mole-rat); C. pretoriae (Highveld mole-rat)	Southern Africa	Size range: 13 cm (5 in) long, plus 1 cm (0.4 in) tail (Mahali mole-rat) to 18 cm (7 in) long, plus 3 cm (1 in) tail (Natal mole-rat) Habitats: Grassland and shrubland Diets: Roots, bulbs, tubers, and aloe leaves, as well as earthworms and insects
Fukomys (tropical mole-rat)	Kock, Ingram, Frabotta, Honeycutt, & Burda, 2006 Thirteen species: F. anselli (Ansell's mole-rat); F. bocagei (Bocage's mole-rat); F. damarensis (Damaraland mole-rat, pictured); F. darlingi (Mashona mole-rat); F. foxi (Nigerian mole-rat); F. hanangensis (Hanang mole-rat); F. ilariae (Somali striped mole-rat); F. kafuensis (Kafue mole-rat); F. livingstoni (Livingstone's mole-rat); F. mechowi (Mechow's mole-rat); F. ochraceocinereus (Ochre mole-rat); F. vandewoestijneae (Caroline's mole-rat); F. zechi (Ghana mole-rat)	Central and southern Africa	Size range: 8 cm (3 in) long, plus 1 cm (0.4 in) tail (Caroline's mole-rat) to 26 cm (10 in) long, plus 4 cm (2 in) tail (Mechow's mole-rat) Habitats: Grassland, savanna, forest, and shrubland Diets: Roots, bulbs, tubers, and aloe leaves, as well as earthworms and insects
Georychus	Illiger, 1811 One species: G. capensis (Cape mole-rat)	South Africa and Lesotho	Size: 8–23 cm (3–9 in) long, plus 1–3 cm (0.4–1.2 in) tail Habitats: Shrubland and forest Diet: Tubers, roots, and bulbs
Heliophobius	Peters, 1846 One species: H. argenteocinereus (Silvery mole-rat)	Southeastern Africa	Size: 13–20 cm (5–8 in) long, plus 0.5–2 cm (0.2–0.8 in) tail Habitats: Savanna, shrubland, grassland, and caves Diet: Tubers and bulbs

===== Family Heterocephalidae =====
Members of the Heterocephalidae family are called heterocephalids. It includes a single species, which eats tubers, roots, and corms.

Not assigned to a named subfamily – one genus
Name	Authority and species	Range	Size and ecology
Heterocephalus	Rüppell, 1842 One species: H. glaber (Naked mole-rat)	Eastern Africa	Size: 7–11 cm (3–4 in) long, plus 3–5 cm (1–2 in) tail Habitats: Savanna, shrubland, grassland, and caves Diet: Tubers, roots, and corms

===== Family Petromuridae =====
Members of the Petromuridae family are called petromurids. It contains a single species, which eats vegetation, seeds, and berries.

Not assigned to a named subfamily – one genus
Name	Authority and species	Range	Size and ecology
Petromus	A. Smith, 1831 One species: P. typicus (Dassie rat)	Southwestern Africa	Size: 13–22 cm (5–9 in) long, plus 11–18 cm (4–7 in) tail Habitats: Shrubland and rocky areas Diet: Vegetation, seeds, and berries

===== Family Thryonomyidae =====
Members of the Thryonomyidae family are called thryonomyids or cane rats. It contains two species, which eats grass and cane, as well as bark, nuts, and fruit.

Not assigned to a named subfamily – one genus
Name	Authority and species	Range	Size and ecology
Thryonomys (cane rat)	Fitzinger, 1867 Two species: T. gregorianus (Lesser cane rat); T. swinderianus (Greater cane rat, pictured)	Sub-Saharan Africa	Size range: 41 cm (16 in) long, plus 11 cm (4 in) tail (lesser cane rat) to 77 cm (30 in) long, plus 20 cm (8 in) tail (greater cane rat) Habitats: Shrubland, grassland, inland wetlands, and forest Diets: Grass and cane, as well as bark, nuts, and fruit

=== Suborder Myomorpha ===
==== Superfamily Dipodoidea ====
===== Family Dipodidae =====
Members of the Dipodidae family are called dipodids or jerboas. They are omnivores, and eat a variety of vegetation as well as insects, arachnids, and lizards. Dipodidae comprises 33 extant species in 13 genera, which are divided into 4 subfamilies: Allactaginae contains 16 species, Cardiocraniinae contains 7 species, Dipodinae contains 9, and Euchoreutinae contains a single species.

Subfamily Allactaginae – Vinogradov, 1925 – four genera
Name	Authority and species	Range	Size and ecology
Allactaga (five-toed jerboa)	F. Cuvier, 1836 Eight species: A. balikunica (Balikun jerboa); A. bullata (Gobi jerboa); A. firouzi (Iranian jerboa); A. hotsoni (Hotson's jerboa); A. major (Great jerboa); A. severtzovi (Severtzov's jerboa); A. sibirica (Mongolian five-toed jerboa); A. tetradactyla (Four-toed jerboa, pictured)	Northern Africa, central and western Asia, and eastern Europe	Size range: 9 cm (4 in) long, plus 16 cm (6 in) tail (Hotson's jerboa) to 23 cm (9 in) long, plus 30 cm (12 in) tail (great jerboa) Habitats: Desert, coastal marine, shrubland, grassland, and forest Diets: Vegetation, seeds, roots, tubers, insects, and larvae, as well as molluscs
Allactodipus	Kolesnikov, 1937 One species: A. bobrinskii (Bobrinski's jerboa)	Central Asia	Size: 11–14 cm (4–6 in) long, plus 17–20 cm (7–8 in) tail Habitats: Desert Diet: Vegetation and insects
Pygeretmus (fat-tailed jerboa)	Gloger, 1841 Three species: P. platyurus (Lesser fat-tailed jerboa); P. pumilio (Dwarf fat-tailed jerboa); P. shitkovi (Greater fat-tailed jerboa)	Central Asia	Size range: 7 cm (3 in) long, plus 7 cm (3 in) tail (lesser fat-tailed jerboa) to 14 cm (6 in) long, plus 18 cm (7 in) tail (dwarf fat-tailed jerboa) Habitats: Shrubland and desert Diets: Succulent plants and other vegetation, bulbs, rhizomes, roots, spiders, and insects
Scarturus (four- and five-toed jerboa)	Gloger, 1841 Four species: S. elater (Small five-toed jerboa); S. euphratica (Euphrates jerboa); S. vinogradovi (Vinogradov's jerboa); S. williamsi (Williams's jerboa, pictured)	Central and western Asia	Size range: 7 cm (3 in) long, plus 14 cm (6 in) tail (Euphrates jerboa) to 15 cm (6 in) long, plus 26 cm (10 in) tail (Williams's jerboa) Habitats: Shrubland, grassland, and desert Diets: Sprouts, seeds, underground plant parts, other vegetation, and insects

Subfamily Cardiocraniinae – Vinogradov, 1925 – three genera
Name	Authority and species	Range	Size and ecology
Cardiocranius	Satunin, 1903 One species: C. paradoxus (Five-toed pygmy jerboa)	East-central Asia	Size: 5–7 cm (2–3 in) long, plus 6–10 cm (2–4 in) tail Habitats: Desert Diet: Seeds
Salpingotulus	Pavlinov, 1980 One species: S. michaelis (Baluchistan pygmy jerboa)	Pakistan	Size: 4–5 cm (2 in) long, plus 7–10 cm (3–4 in) tail Habitats: Desert Diet: Grass seeds, stems, and other vegetation
Salpingotus (three-toed dwarf jerboa)	Vinogradov, 1922 Five species: S. crassicauda (Thick-tailed pygmy jerboa, pictured); S. heptneri (Heptner's pygmy jerboa); S. kozlovi (Kozlov's pygmy jerboa); S. pallidus (Pale pygmy jerboa); S. thomasi (Thomas's pygmy jerboa)	Central Asia	Size range: 4 cm (2 in) long, plus 8 cm (3 in) tail (Heptner's pygmy jerboa) to 7 cm (3 in) long, plus 14 cm (6 in) tail (Kozlov's pygmy jerboa) Habitats: Shrubland, desert, and grassland Diets: Insects, arachnids, and vegetation

Subfamily Dipodinae – G. Fischer, 1817 – five genera
Name	Authority and species	Range	Size and ecology
Dipus	Zimmermann, 1780 One species: D. sagitta (Northern three-toed jerboa)	Western, central, and eastern Asia	Size: 10–15 cm (4–6 in) long, plus 12–20 cm (5–8 in) tail Habitats: Shrubland and desert Diet: All parts of plants, as well as insects
Eremodipus	Vinogradov, 1930 One species: E. lichtensteini (Lichtenstein's jerboa)	Central Asia	Size: 10–12 cm (4–5 in) long, plus 13–17 cm (5–7 in) tail Habitats: Desert Diet: Roots, sprouts, seeds, grains, and vegetables
Jaculus (desert jerboa)	Erxleben, 1777 Three species: J. blanfordi (Blanford's jerboa); J. jaculus (Lesser Egyptian jerboa, pictured); J. orientalis (Greater Egyptian jerboa)	Northern Africa, Middle East, and central Asia	Size range: 9 cm (4 in) long, plus 17 cm (7 in) tail (greater Egyptian jerboa) to 15 cm (6 in) long, plus 22 cm (9 in) tail (Blanford's jerboa) Habitats: Desert, coastal marine, shrubland, grassland, and rocky areas Diets: Roots, sprouts, seeds, grains, and vegetables
Paradipus	Vinogradov, 1930 One species: P. ctenodactylus (Comb-toed jerboa)	Central Asia	Size: 14–17 cm (6–7 in) long, plus 18–22 cm (7–9 in) tail Habitats: Desert Diet: All parts of desert plants
Stylodipus (thick-tailed three-toed jerboa)	Allen, 1925 Three species: S. andrewsi (Andrews's three-toed jerboa); S. sungorus (Mongolian three-toed jerboa); S. telum (Thick-tailed three-toed jerboa, pictured)	Ukraine and western and central Asia	Size range: 11 cm (4 in) long, plus 13 cm (5 in) tail (thick-tailed three-toed jerboa) to 14 cm (6 in) long, plus 17 cm (7 in) tail (Andrews's three-toed jerboa) Habitats: Shrubland, desert, grassland, and forest Diets: Lichen, rhizomes, bulbs, seeds, and wheat

Subfamily Euchoreutinae – Lyon, 1901 – one genus
Name	Authority and species	Range	Size and ecology
Euchoreutes	W. L. Sclater, 1891 One species: E. naso (Long-eared jerboa)	Southern Mongolia and China	Size: 9–11 cm (4 in) long, plus 14–18 cm (6–7 in) tail Habitats: Shrubland and desert Diet: Insects and lizards

===== Family Sminthidae =====
Members of the Sminthidae family are called sminthids or birch mice. They are omnivores and primarily eat seeds, berries, and insects. Sminthidae comprises sixteen extant species in a single genus.

Not assigned to a named subfamily – one genus
Name	Authority and species	Range	Size and ecology
Sicista (birch mouse)	Gray, 1827 Sixteen species: S. armenica (Armenian birch mouse); S. betulina (Northern birch mouse, pictured); S. caucasica (Caucasian birch mouse); S. caudata (Long-tailed birch mouse); S. cimlanica (Tsimlyansk birch mouse); S. concolor (Chinese birch mouse); S. kazbegica (Kazbeg birch mouse); S. kluchorica (Kluchor birch mouse); S. loriger (Nordmann's birch mouse); S. napaea (Altai birch mouse); S. pseudonapaea (Gray birch mouse); S. severtzovi (Severtzov's birch mouse); S. strandi (Strand's birch mouse); S. subtilis (Southern birch mouse); S. tianshanica (Tien Shan birch mouse); S. trizona (Hungarian birch mouse)	Asia and Europe	Size range: 4 cm (2 in) long, plus 8 cm (3 in) tail (Caucasian birch mouse) to 8 cm (3 in) long, plus 11 cm (4 in) tail (Altai birch mouse) Habitats: Inland wetlands, shrubland, forest, and grassland Diets: Seeds, berries, and insects

===== Family Zapodidae =====
Members of the Zapodidae family are called zapodids or jumping mice. They are omnivores and eat a variety of vegetation and insects. Zapodidae comprises five extant species in three genera.

Not assigned to a named subfamily – three genera
Name	Authority and species	Range	Size and ecology
Eozapus	Preble, 1899 One species: E. setchuanus (Chinese jumping mouse)	China	Size: 7–10 cm (3–4 in) long, plus 11–15 cm (4–6 in) tail Habitats: Forest, shrubland, and grassland Diet: Vegetation and insects
Napaeozapus	Preble, 1899 One species: N. insignis (Woodland jumping mouse)	Eastern Canada and eastern United States	Size: 8–10 cm (3–4 in) long, plus 11–16 cm (4–6 in) tail Habitats: Forest, shrubland, and inland wetlands Diet: Seeds, fungi, and insects, as well as fruit, nuts, and other vegetation
Zapus (meadow jumping mouse)	Coues, 1875 Three species: Z. hudsonius (Meadow jumping mouse); Z. princeps (Western jumping mouse, pictured); Z. trinotatus (Pacific jumping mouse)	Canada and United States	Size range: 7 cm (3 in) long, plus 10 cm (4 in) tail (meadow jumping mouse) to 11 cm (4 in) long, plus 16 cm (6 in) tail (Pacific jumping mouse) Habitats: Forest, shrubland, grassland, and inland wetlands Diets: Seeds, as well as fungi, nuts, berries, fruit, and insects

==== Superfamily Muroidea ====
===== Family Calomyscidae =====
Members of the Calomyscidae family are called calomyscids or brush-tailed mice. They are omnivores and primarily eat seeds, as well as flowers, leaves, and animal matter. Calomyscidae comprises eight extant species in a single genus.

Not assigned to a named subfamily – one genus
Name	Authority and species	Range	Size and ecology
Calomyscus (mouse-like hamster)	Thomas, 1905 Eight species: C. bailwardi (Zagros Mountains mouse-like hamster); C. baluchi (Baluchi mouse-like hamster); C. elburzensis (Goodwin's brush-tailed mouse); C. grandis (Noble mouse-like hamster); C. hotsoni (Hotson's mouse-like hamster); C. mystax (Great Balkhan mouse-like hamster); C. tsolovi (Tsolov's mouse-like hamster); C. urartensis (Urar mouse-like hamster, pictured)	Central Asia	Size range: 6 cm (2 in) long, plus 5 cm (2 in) tail (Tsolov's mouse-like hamster) to 10 cm (4 in) long, plus 11 cm (4 in) tail (great Balkhan mouse-like hamster) Habitats: Shrubland, grassland and rocky areas Diets: Seeds, as well as flowers, leaves, and animal matter

===== Family Cricetidae =====
Members of the Cricetidae family are called cricetids and include hamsters, voles, lemmings, muskrats, and New World rats and mice. They eat vegetation, seeds, and insects, and some also eat fungi, fish, and small animals. Cricetidae comprises 694 extant species, the second-most of any mammal family, divided into 143 genera. These genera are divided into five subfamilies: Arvicolinae, containing 158 species of voles, lemmings, and muskrats; Cricetinae, containing 18 species of hamsters; Neotominae, containing 123 species of deer mice, packrats, and grasshopper mice; Sigmodontinae, containing 385 species of New World rats and mice; and Tylomyinae, containing 10 species of vesper and climbing rats. Additionally, one species in Neotominae and ten species in Sigmodontinae were driven extinct after 1500 due to the European colonization of the Americas and introduction of non-native rats, with some species surviving until the 1900s.

Subfamily Arvicolinae – Gray, 1821 – 30 genera
Name	Authority and species	Range	Size and ecology
Alexandromys (grass vole)	Ognev, 1914 Eleven species: A. evoronensis (Evorsk vole); A. fortis (Reed vole, pictured); A. kikuchii (Taiwan vole); A. limnophilus (Lacustrine vole); A. maximowiczii (Maximowicz's vole); A. middendorffii (Middendorff's vole); A. mongolicus (Mongolian vole); A. montebelli (Japanese grass vole); A. mujanensis (Muya Valley vole); A. oeconomus (Tundra vole); A. sachalinensis (Sakhalin vole)	Eastern and northern Asia, Europe, and northwestern North America	Size range: 7 cm (3 in) long, plus 2 cm (0.8 in) tail (tundra vole) to 18 cm (7 in) long, plus 8 cm (3 in) tail (reed vole) Habitats: Forest, shrubland, inland wetlands, desert, rocky areas, and grassland Diets: Grass, leaves, twigs, bulbs, tubers, seeds, nuts, and other vegetation
Alticola (high mountain vole)	Blanford, 1881 Twelve species: A. albicaudus (White-tailed mountain vole); A. argentatus (Silver mountain vole, pictured); A. barakshin (Gobi Altai mountain vole); A. lemminus (Lemming vole); A. macrotis (Large-eared vole); A. montosa (Central Kashmir vole); A. olchonensis (Lake Baikal mountain vole); A. roylei (Royle's mountain vole); A. semicanus (Mongolian silver vole); A. stoliczkanus (Stolička's mountain vole); A. strelzowi (Flat-headed vole); A. tuvinicus (Tuva silver vole)	Asia	Size range: 8 cm (3 in) long, plus 1 cm (0.4 in) tail (lemming vole) to 14 cm (6 in) long, plus 5 cm (2 in) tail (flat-headed vole) Habitats: Forest, rocky areas, shrubland, and grassland Diets: Stems and leaves
Arborimus (tree vole)	Taylor, 1915 Three species: A. albipes (White-footed vole); A. longicaudus (Red tree vole, pictured); A. pomo (Sonoma tree vole)	Western United States	Size range: 9–11 cm (4 in) long, plus 6–9 cm (2–4 in) tail (red tree vole) Habitats: Forest and inland wetlands Diets: Conifer needles
Arvicola (water vole)	Lacépède, 1799 Three species: A. amphibius (European water vole, pictured); A. italicus (Italian water vole); A. sapidus (Southwestern water vole)	Europe and Asia	Size range: 12–23 cm (5–9 in) long, plus 5–14 cm (2–6 in) tail (European water vole) Habitats: Forest, inland wetlands, and grassland Diets: Aquatic plants, herbs, grass, twigs, buds, roots, bulbs, and fruit
Caryomys (brownish vole)	Thomas, 1911 Two species: C. eva (Ganzu vole); C. inez (Kolan vole)	Central China	Size range: 8–11 cm (3–4 in) long, plus 4–6 cm (2 in) tail (Ganzu vole) Habitats: Forest Diets: Grass, leaves, twigs, bulbs, tubers, seeds, nuts, and other vegetation
Chionomys (snow vole)	Miller, 1908 Three species: C. gud (Caucasian snow vole); C. nivalis (European snow vole, pictured); C. roberti (Robert's snow vole)	Europe and western Asia	Size range: 10 cm (4 in) long, plus 4 cm (2 in) tail (European snow vole) to 16 cm (6 in) long, plus 11 cm (4 in) tail (Robert's snow vole) Habitats: Forest and rocky areas Diets: Grass, herbs, and seeds
Clethrionomys (bank vole)	Gistel, 1850 Five species: C. californicus (Western red-backed vole); C. centralis (Tien Shan red-backed vole); C. gapperi (Southern red-backed vole); C. glareolus (Bank vole, pictured); C. rutilus (Northern red-backed vole)	Europe, Asia, and North America	Size range: 8–14 cm (3–6 in) long, plus 3–8 cm (1–3 in) tail (bank vole) Habitats: Forest, rocky areas, shrubland, and grassland Diets: Tender vegetation, nuts, seeds, bark, lichens, fungus, and insects
Craseomys (grey-sided vole)	Miller, 1900 Six species: C. andersoni (Japanese red-backed vole); C. regulus (Royal vole, pictured); C. rex (Hokkaido red-backed vole); C. rufocanus (Grey red-backed vole); C. shanseius (Shansei vole); C. smithii (Smith's vole)	Northern Europe and northern and eastern Asia	Size range: 7 cm (3 in) long, plus 4 cm (2 in) tail (Japanese red-backed vole) to 15 cm (6 in) long, plus 7 cm (3 in) tail (grey red-backed vole) Habitats: Forest, shrubland, inland wetlands, rocky areas, and grassland Diets: Tender vegetation, nuts, seeds, bark, lichens, fungus, and insects
Dicrostonyx (collared lemming)	Gloger, 1841 Eight species: D. groenlandicus (Northern collared lemming); D. hudsonius (Ungava collared lemming); D. nelsoni (Nelson's collared lemming); D. nunatakensis (Ogilvie Mountains collared lemming); D. richardsoni (Richardson's collared lemming); D. torquatus (Arctic lemming); D. unalascensis (Unalaska collared lemming); D. vinogradovi (Wrangel lemming)	Russia and northern North America	Size range: 8 cm (3 in) long, plus 1 cm (0.4 in) tail (Arctic lemming) to 16 cm (6 in) long, plus 3 cm (1 in) tail (northern collared lemming) Habitats: Rocky areas, shrubland, inland wetlands, and grassland Diets: Fruit, flowers, grass, sedges, buds, twigs, and bark
Dinaromys	Kretzoi, 1955 One species: D. bogdanovi (Balkan snow vole)	Southern Europe	Size: 13–16 cm (5–6 in) long, plus 8–11 cm (3–4 in) tail Habitats: Rocky areas Diet: Grass
Ellobius (mole vole)	Fischer von Waldheim, 1814 Five species: E. alaicus (Alai mole vole); E. fuscocapillus (Southern mole vole); E. lutescens (Transcaucasian mole vole); E. talpinus (Northern mole vole, pictured); E. tancrei (Zaisan mole vole)	Eastern Europe and western and central Asia	Size range: 8 cm (3 in) long, plus 0.5 cm (0 in) tail (northern mole vole) to 15 cm (6 in) long, plus 2 cm (0.8 in) tail (southern mole vole) Habitats: Desert, shrubland, and grassland Diets: Bulbs, tubers, and other underground plant parts
Eolagurus (steppe lemming)	Argiropulo, 1946 Two species: E. luteus (Yellow steppe lemming); E. przewalskii (Przewalski's steppe lemming, pictured)	Central Asia	Size range: 12 cm (5 in) long, plus 0.5 cm (0 in) tail (Przewalski's steppe lemming) to 16 cm (6 in) long, plus 3 cm (1 in) tail (yellow steppe lemming) Habitats: Shrubland and grassland Diets: Bulbs, seeds, and roots
Eothenomys (Père David's vole)	Miller, 1896 Eight species: E. cachinus (Kachin red-backed vole); E. chinensis (Pratt's vole); E. custos (Southwest China vole); E. melanogaster (Père David's vole, pictured); E. miletus (Yunnan red-backed vole); E. olitor (Chaotung vole); E. proditor (Yulungshan vole); E. wardi (Ward's red-backed vole)	Eastern Asia	Size range: 7 cm (3 in) long, plus 2 cm (0.8 in) tail (Père David's vole) to 14 cm (6 in) long, plus 7 cm (3 in) tail (Kachin red-backed vole) Habitats: Forest, rocky areas, shrubland, and grassland Diets: Tender vegetation, nuts, seeds, bark, lichens, fungus, and insects
Hyperacrius (Kashmir vole)	Miller, 1896 Two species: H. fertilis (True's vole); H. wynnei (Murree vole)	Northern Pakistan and western China	Size range: 8 cm (3 in) long, plus 1 cm (0.4 in) tail (True's vole) to 14 cm (6 in) long, plus 5 cm (2 in) tail (Murree vole) Habitats: Forest, shrubland, and grassland Diets: Grass, stems, and roots
Lagurus	Gloger, 1841 One species: L. lagurus (Steppe lemming)	Eastern Europe and western, central, and eastern Asia	Size: 7–13 cm (3–5 in) long, plus 0.5–2 cm (0.2–0.8 in) tail Habitats: Shrubland and grassland Diet: Green vegetation, tubers, and bulbs
Lasiopodomys (narrow-headed steppe vole)	Lataste, 1887 Two species: L. brandtii (Brandt's vole); L. mandarinus (Mandarin vole, pictured)	Eastern Asia	Size range: 9 cm (4 in) long, plus 2 cm (0.8 in) tail (Mandarin vole) to 15 cm (6 in) long, plus 3 cm (1 in) tail (Brandt's vole) Habitats: Shrubland and grassland Diets: Grass, vegetation, and roots
Lemmiscus	Thomas, 1912 One species: L. curtatus (Sagebrush vole)	Western United States and western Canada	Size: 9–12 cm (4–5 in) long, plus 1–3 cm (0–1 in) tail Habitats: Shrubland and grassland Diet: Green vegetation
Lemmus (lemming)	Link, 1795 Five species: L. amurensis (Amur lemming); L. lemmus (Norway lemming, pictured); L. portenkoi (Wrangel Island lemming); L. sibiricus (West Siberian lemming); L. trimucronatus (Canadian lemming)	Northern Europe, northern Asia, and western North America	Size range: 8 cm (3 in) long, plus 1 cm (0.4 in) tail (Amur lemming) to 16 cm (6 in) long, plus 2 cm (0.8 in) tail (West Siberian lemming) Habitats: Forest, shrubland, inland wetlands, and grassland Diets: Sedges, grass, bark, leaves, berries, lichens, and roots
Microtus (meadow vole)	Schrank, 1798 57 species: M. abbreviatus (Insular vole); M. afghanus (Afghan vole); M. agrestis (Short-tailed field vole); M. anatolicus (Anatolian vole); M. arvalis (Common vole); M. brachycercus (Calabria pine vole); M. breweri (Beach vole); M. bucharensis (Bucharian vole); M. cabrerae (Cabrera's vole); M. californicus (California vole); M. canicaudus (Gray-tailed vole); M. chrotorrhinus (Rock vole); M. daghestanicus (Daghestan pine vole); M. dogramacii (Doğramaci's vole); M. duodecimcostatus (Mediterranean pine vole); M. felteni (Felten's vole); M. gerbei (Gerbe's vole); M. guatemalensis (Guatemalan vole); M. guentheri (Günther's vole); M. ilaeus (Tien Shan vole); M. irani (Persian vole); M. kermanensis (Kerman vole); M. lavernedii (Mediterranean field vole); M. liechtensteini (Liechtenstein's pine vole); M. longicaudus (Long-tailed vole); M. lusitanicus (Lusitanian pine vole); M. majori (Major's pine vole); M. mexicanus (Mexican vole); M. miurus (Singing vole); M. montanus (Montane vole); M. multiplex (Alpine pine vole); M. mystacinus (Caspian gray vole); M. nebrodensis (Sicilian pine vole); M. oaxacensis (Tarabundí vole); M. obscurus (Altai vole); M. ochrogaster (Prairie vole); M. oregoni (Creeping vole); M. paradoxus (Paradox vole); M. pennsylvanicus (Eastern meadow vole); M. pinetorum (Woodland vole, pictured); M. qazvinensis (Qazvin vole); M. quasiater (Jalapan pine vole); M. richardsoni (North American water vole); M. rossiaemeridionalis (East European grey vole); M. rozianus (Portuguese field vole); M. savii (Savi's pine vole); M. schelkovnikovi (Schelkovnikov's pine vole); M. schidlovskii (Schidlovsky's vole); M. socialis (Social vole); M. subterraneus (European pine vole); M. tatricus (Tatra pine vole); M. thomasi (Thomas's pine vole); M. townsendii (Townsend's vole); M. transcaspicus (Transcaspian vole); M. umbrosus (Zempoaltépec vole); M. xanthognathus (Taiga vole); M. yuldaschi (Juniper vole)	North America, Central America, Europe, and Asia	Size range: 6 cm (2 in) long, plus 1 cm (0.4 in) tail (Afghan vole) to 18 cm (7 in) long, plus 10 cm (4 in) tail (North American water vole) Habitats: Forest, intertidal marine, coastal marine, savanna, shrubland, desert, inland wetlands, rocky areas, and grassland Diets: Grass, leaves, twigs, bulbs, tubers, seeds, nuts, and other vegetation
Myopus	Miller, 1910 One species: M. schisticolor (Wood lemming)	Northern Europe and northern Asia	Size: 9–12 cm (4–5 in) long, plus 1–2 cm (0.4–0.8 in) tail Habitats: Forest and inland wetlands Diet: Moss, stems, and bark
Neodon (mountain vole)	Horsfield, 1841 Six species: M. clarkei (Clarke's vole); N. forresti (Forrest's mountain vole); N. fuscus (Plateau vole, pictured); N. irene (Chinese scrub vole); N. linzhiensis (Linzhi mountain vole); N. sikimensis (Sikkim mountain vole)	China and southeastern Asia	Size range: 8 cm (3 in) long, plus 2 cm (0.8 in) tail (Chinese scrub vole) to 15 cm (6 in) long, plus 5 cm (2 in) tail (plateau vole) Habitats: Forest, shrubland, rocky areas, and grassland Diets: Grass, leaves, twigs, bulbs, tubers, seeds, nuts, and other vegetation
Neofiber	True, 1884 One species: N. alleni (Round-tailed muskrat)	Southeastern United States	Size: 18–21 cm (7–8 in) long, plus 9–17 cm (4–7 in) tail Habitats: Grassland and inland wetlands Diet: Maidencane, as well as rushes, sedges, sawgrass, and mangrove bark
Ondatra	Link, 1795 One species: O. zibethicus (Muskrat)	North America, Europe, and Asia	Size: 27–30 cm (11–12 in) long, plus 20–25 cm (8–10 in) tail Habitats: Inland wetlands Diet: Cattails, bulrushes, grass, and other vegetation, as well as crabs, crayfish, mussels, and small fish
Phaiomys	Blyth, 1863 One species: P. leucurus (Blyth's vole)	Western China	Size: 9–13 cm (4–5 in) long, plus 2–4 cm (1–2 in) tail Habitats: Forest, grassland, rocky areas, and shrubland Diet: Grass, leaves, twigs, bulbs, tubers, seeds, nuts, and other vegetation
Phenacomys (heather vole)	Merriam, 1889 Two species: P. intermedius (Western heather vole); P. ungava (Eastern heather vole, pictured)	Northwestern United States and Canada	Size range: 8–12 cm (3–5 in) long, plus 2–4 cm (0.8–1.6 in) tail (eastern heather vole) Habitats: Forest, shrubland, and grassland Diets: Bark, buds, heaths, forbs, berries, and seeds
Proedromys (Duke of Bedford's vole)	Thomas, 1911 Two species: P. bedfordi (Duke of Bedford's vole); P. liangshanensis (Liangshan vole)	Central China	Size range: 9 cm (4 in) long, plus 3 cm (1 in) tail (Duke of Bedford's vole) to 14 cm (6 in) long, plus 9 cm (4 in) tail (Liangshan vole) Habitats: Forest and grassland Diets: Grass, leaves, twigs, bulbs, tubers, seeds, nuts, and other vegetation
Prometheomys	Satunin, 1901 One species: P. schaposchnikowi (Long-clawed mole vole)	Western Asia	Size: 12–17 cm (5–7 in) long, plus 3–6 cm (1–2 in) tail Habitats: Grassland Diet: Green vegetation and roots
Stenocranius (narrow-headed vole)	Kaschtschenko, 1901 Two species: S. gregalis (Narrow-headed vole, pictured); S. raddei (Radde's vole)	Northern Asia	Size range: 8–15 cm (3–6 in) long, plus 1–5 cm (0.4–2.0 in) tail (narrow-headed vole) Habitats: Grassland Diets: Grass, leaves, twigs, bulbs, tubers, seeds, nuts, and other vegetation
Synaptomys (bog lemming)	Baird, 1857 Two species: S. borealis (Northern bog lemming); S. cooperi (Southern bog lemming, pictured)	Canada and northern United States	Size range: 9 cm (4 in) long, plus 1 cm (0.4 in) tail (northern bog lemming) to 14 cm (6 in) long, plus 3 cm (1 in) tail (southern bog lemming) Habitats: Forest, shrubland, inland wetlands, and grassland Diets: Green vegetation as well as slugs, snails, and other invertebrates
Volemys (Szechuan vole)	Zagorodnyuk, 1990 Two species: V. millicens (Szechuan vole); V. musseri (Marie's vole)	Central China	Size range: 8 cm (3 in) long, plus 4 cm (2 in) tail (Szechuan vole) to 13 cm (5 in) long, plus 8 cm (3 in) tail (Marie's vole) Habitats: Forest, rocky areas, and grassland Diets: Grass, leaves, twigs, bulbs, tubers, seeds, nuts, and other vegetation

Subfamily Cricetinae – Waldheim, 1817 – seven genera
Name	Authority and species	Range	Size and ecology
Allocricetulus (Mongolian hamster)	Argiropulo, 1932 Two species: A. curtatus (Mongolian hamster); A. eversmanni (Eversmann's hamster)	East-central and central Asia	Size range: 10 cm (4 in) long, plus 1 cm (0.4 in) tail (Mongolian hamster) to 14 cm (6 in) long, plus 4 cm (2 in) tail (Eversmann's hamster) Habitats: Grassland and shrubland Diets: Grains, beans, lentils, roots, and plant material, as well as insects and frogs
Cansumys	Allen, 1928 One species: C. canus (Gansu hamster)	Central China	Size: 12–14 cm (5–6 in) long, plus 9–11 cm (4 in) tail Habitats: Forest Diet: Leaves and grasses
Cricetulus (ratlike hamster)	A. Milne-Edwards, 1867 Three species: C. barabensis (Chinese striped hamster, pictured); C. longicaudatus (Long-tailed dwarf hamster); C. sokolovi (Sokolov's dwarf hamster)	Central and eastern Asia	Size range: 7 cm (3 in) long, plus 1 cm (0.4 in) tail (Chinese striped hamster) to 14 cm (6 in) long, plus 5 cm (2 in) tail (long-tailed dwarf hamster) Habitats: Grassland, forest, inland wetlands, desert, rocky areas, and shrubland Diets: Shoots, seeds, and insects
Cricetus (golden hamster)	Leske, 1779 One species: C. cricetus (European hamster)	Europe and western and central Asia	Size: 16–32 cm (6–13 in) long, plus 2–7 cm (1–3 in) tail Habitats: Shrubland and grassland Diet: Grains, beans, lentils, roots, and plant material, as well as insects and frogs
Mesocricetus	Nehring, 1898 Four species: M. auratus (Golden hamster); M. brandti (Turkish hamster, pictured); M. newtoni (Romanian hamster); M. raddei (Ciscaucasian hamster)	Western Asia and eastern Europe	Size range: 12 cm (5 in) long, plus 1 cm (0.4 in) tail (golden hamster) to 22 cm (9 in) long, plus 2 cm (0.8 in) tail (Ciscaucasian hamster) Habitats: Grassland and shrubland Diets: Omnivorous, including a variety of vegetation, seeds, fruit, insects, and small vertebrates
Nothocricetulus	Lebedev, Bannikova, Neumann, Ushakova, Ivanova, & Surov, 2018 One species: C. migratorius (Grey dwarf hamster)	Asia and eastern Europe	Size range: 8–15 cm (3–6 in) long, plus 1–4 cm (0.4–1.6 in) Habitats: Forest, shrubland, grassland, and desert Diets: Shoots, seeds, and insects
Phodopus (dwarf hamster)	Miller, 1910 Three species: P. campbelli (Campbell's dwarf hamster); P. roborovskii (Roborovski dwarf hamster); P. sungorus (Winter white dwarf hamster)	East-central Asia and Kazakhstan and southern Russia	Size range: 7 cm (3 in) long, plus 0.5 cm (0.2 in) tail (Roborovski dwarf hamster) to 11 cm (4 in) long, plus 2 cm (0.8 in) tail (Campbell's dwarf hamster) Habitats: Desert and shrubland Diets: Seeds and plant material
Tscherskia	Ogniov, 1914 One species: T. triton (Greater long-tailed hamster)	Eastern Asia	Size: 14–22 cm (6–9 in) long, plus 6–11 cm (2–4 in) tail Habitats: Inland wetlands Diet: Seeds as well as shoots
Urocricetus	Satunin, 1903 Two species: C. alticola (Tibetan dwarf hamster); C. kamensis (Kam dwarf hamster)	China	Size: 8 cm (3 in) long, plus 2 cm (1 in) tail (Tibetan dwarf hamster) to 12 cm (5 in) long, plus 7 cm (3 in) tail (Kam dwarf hamster) Habitats: Forest, shrubland, grassland, and inland wetlands Diet: Shoots, seeds, and insects

Subfamily Neotominae – Merriam, 1894 – sixteen genera
Name	Authority and species	Range	Size and ecology
Baiomys (New World pygmy mouse)	True, 1894 Two species: B. musculus (Mexican pygmy mouse, pictured); B. taylori (Northern pygmy mouse)	Southern United States, Mexico, and northern Central America	Size range: 5 cm (2 in) long, plus 3 cm (1 in) tail (northern pygmy mouse) to 8 cm (3 in) long, plus 6 cm (2 in) tail (Mexican pygmy mouse) Habitats: Grassland, desert, forest, and shrubland Diets: Cactus stems and fruit, green vegetation, seeds, grass, and insects
Habromys (slender-tailed deer mouse)	Hooper & Musser, 1964 Six species: H. chinanteco (Chinanteco deer mouse); H. delicatulus (Delicate deer mouse); H. ixtlani (Ixtlán deer mouse); H. lepturus (Zempoaltepec deer mouse); H. lophurus (Crested-tailed deer mouse); H. simulatus (Jico deer mouse)	Mexico and northern Central America	Size range: 7 cm (3 in) long, plus 7 cm (3 in) tail (delicate deer mouse) to 14 cm (6 in) long, plus 15 cm (6 in) tail (Ixtlán deer mouse) Habitats: Forest Diets: Plant material and invertebrates
Hodomys	Merriam, 1894 One species: H. alleni (Allen's woodrat)	Southern Mexico	Size: 16–22 cm (6–9 in) long, plus 14–22 cm (6–9 in) tail Habitats: Shrubland Diet: Plant material and invertebrates
Isthmomys	Hooper & Musser, 1964 Two species: I. flavidus (Yellow isthmus rat); I. pirrensis (Mount Pirri isthmus rat)	Panama and northwestern Colombia	Size range: 15–18 cm (6–7 in) long, plus 18–20 cm (7–8 in) tail (Mount Pirri isthmus rat) Habitats: Forest Diets: Plant material and invertebrates
Megadontomys (giant deer mouse)	Merriam, 1898 Three species: M. cryophilus (Oaxaca giant deer mouse, pictured); M. nelsoni (Nelson's giant deer mouse); M. thomasi (Thomas's giant deer mouse)	Southern Mexico	Size range: 13 cm (5 in) long, plus 17 cm (7 in) tail (Nelson's giant deer mouse) to 17 cm (7 in) long, plus 19 cm (7 in) tail (Thomas's giant deer mouse) Habitats: Forest Diets: Berries and seeds
Nelsonia (diminutive woodrat)	Merriam, 1897 Two species: N. goldmani (Goldman's diminutive woodrat); N. neotomodon (Diminutive woodrat)	Central Mexico	Size range: 11 cm (4 in) long, plus 10 cm (4 in) tail (diminutive woodrat) to 14 cm (6 in) long, plus 13 cm (5 in) tail (Goldman's diminutive woodrat) Habitats: Forest Diets: Conifer needles
Neotoma (pack rat)	Say & Ord, 1825 20 species: N. albigula (White-throated woodrat); N. angustapalata (Tamaulipan woodrat); N. bryanti (Bryant's woodrat); N. chrysomelas (Nicaraguan woodrat); N. cinerea (Bushy-tailed woodrat, pictured); N. devia (Arizona woodrat); N. floridana (Eastern woodrat); N. fuscipes (Dusky-footed woodrat); N. goldmani (Goldman's woodrat); N. insularis (Angel de la Guarda woodrat); N. lepida (Desert woodrat); N. leucodon (White-toothed woodrat); N. macrotis (Big-eared woodrat); N. magister (Allegheny woodrat); N. mexicana (Mexican woodrat); N. micropus (Southern Plains woodrat); N. nelsoni (Nelson's woodrat); N. palatina (Bolaños woodrat); N. phenax (Sonoran woodrat); N. stephensi (Stephen's woodrat)	North America and Central America	Size range: 14 cm (6 in) long, plus 10 cm (4 in) tail (Arizona woodrat) to 25 cm (10 in) long, plus 21 cm (8 in) tail (big-eared woodrat) Habitats: Desert, shrubland, grassland, rocky areas, forest, caves, coastal marine, and inland wetlands Diets: Roots, stems, and leaves, as well as seeds and invertebrates
Neotomodon	Merriam, 1898 One species: N. alstoni (Mexican volcano mouse)	Central Mexico	Size: 9–13 cm (4–5 in) long, plus 7–11 cm (3–4 in) tail Habitats: Forest Diet: Plant material and invertebrates
Ochrotomys	Osgood, 1909 One species: O. nuttalli (Golden mouse)	Eastern United States	Size: 5–12 cm (2–5 in) long, plus 5–10 cm (2–4 in) tail Habitats: Shrubland and forest Diet: Seeds
Onychomys (grasshopper mouse)	Baird, 1857 Three species: O. arenicola (Mearns's grasshopper mouse); O. leucogaster (Northern grasshopper mouse); O. torridus (Southern grasshopper mouse)	United States and Mexico	Size range: 8 cm (3 in) long, plus 4 cm (2 in) tail (Mearns's grasshopper mouse) to 13 cm (5 in) long, plus 7 cm (3 in) tail (northern grasshopper mouse) Habitats: Grassland, desert, and shrubland Diets: Insects, scorpions, and small vertebrates, as well as plant material
Osgoodomys	Hooper & Musser, 1964 One species: O. banderanus (Michoacan deer mouse)	Southwestern Mexico	Size: 10–15 cm (4–6 in) long, plus 9–13 cm (4–5 in) tail Habitats: Forest Diet: Plant material and invertebrates
Peromyscus (deer mouse)	Gloger, 1841 57 species: P. attwateri (Texas mouse); P. aztecus (Aztec mouse); P. beatae (Orizaba deer mouse); P. boylii (Brush mouse); P. bullatus (Perote mouse); P. californicus (California deermouse); P. caniceps (Burt's deer mouse); P. crinitus (Canyon mouse); P. dickeyi (Dickey's deer mouse); P. difficilis (Zacatecan deer mouse); P. eremicus (Cactus mouse); P. eva (Eva's desert mouse); P. fraterculus (Northern Baja deer mouse); P. furvus (Blackish deer mouse); P. gossypinus (Cotton mouse); P. grandis (Big deer mouse); P. gratus (Osgood's mouse); P. guardia (Angel Island mouse); P. guatemalensis (Guatemalan deer mouse); P. gymnotis (Naked-eared deer mouse); P. hooperi (Hooper's mouse); P. hylocetes (Transvolcanic deer mouse); P. interparietalis (San Lorenzo mouse); P. keeni (Northwestern deer mouse); P. leucopus (White-footed mouse); P. levipes (Nimble-footed mouse); P. madrensis (Tres Marías Island mouse); P. maniculatus (Eastern deer mouse); P. mayensis (Maya mouse); P. megalops (Brown deer mouse); P. mekisturus (Puebla deer mouse); P. melanocarpus (Black-wristed deer mouse); P. melanophrys (Plateau mouse); P. melanotis (Black-eared mouse); P. melanurus (Black-tailed mouse); P. merriami (Mesquite mouse); P. mexicanus (Mexican deer mouse); P. nasutus (Northern rock mouse); P. ochraventer (El Carrizo deer mouse); P. pectoralis (White-ankled mouse); P. pembertoni (Pemberton's deer mouse); P. perfulvus (Tawny deer mouse); P. polionotus (Oldfield mouse); P. polius (Chihuahuan mouse); P. pseudocrinitus (False canyon mouse); P. sagax (La Palma deermouse); P. schmidlyi (Schmidly's deermouse); P. sejugis (Santa Cruz mouse); P. simulus (Nayarit mouse); P. slevini (Slevin's mouse, pictured); P. spicilegus (Gleaning mouse); P. stephani (San Esteban Island mouse); P. stirtoni (Stirton's deer mouse); P. truei (Pinyon mouse); P. winkelmanni (Winkelmann's mouse); P. yucatanicus (Yucatan deer mouse); P. zarhynchus (Chiapan deer mouse)	North America and Central America	Size range: 7 cm (3 in) long, plus 8 cm (3 in) tail (cactus mouse) to 15 cm (6 in) long, plus 16 cm (6 in) tail (brown deer mouse) Habitats: Desert, shrubland, grassland, rocky areas, forest, caves, intertidal marine, coastal marine, and inland wetlands Diets: A wide variety of plant material, fungi, insects, other invertebrates, and carrion, as well as worms, molluscs, and small vertebrates
Podomys	Osgood, 1909 One species: P. floridanus (Florida mouse)	Southeastern United States	Size: 9–12 cm (4–5 in) long, plus 8–11 cm (3–4 in) tail Habitats: Savanna, forest, grassland, and shrubland Diet: Seeds, nuts, fungi, vegetation, insects, and other invertebrates
Reithrodontomys (harvest mouse)	Giglioli, 1873 21 species: R. brevirostris (Short-nosed harvest mouse); R. burti (Sonoran harvest mouse); R. chrysopsis (Volcano harvest mouse); R. creper (Chiriqui harvest mouse); R. darienensis (Darien harvest mouse); R. fulvescens (Fulvous harvest mouse); R. gracilis (Slender harvest mouse); R. hirsutus (Hairy harvest mouse); R. humulis (Eastern harvest mouse); R. megalotis (Western harvest mouse, pictured); R. mexicanus (Mexican harvest mouse); R. microdon (Small-toothed harvest mouse); R. montanus (Plains harvest mouse); R. musseri (Small harvest mouse); R. paradoxus (Nicaraguan harvest mouse); R. raviventris (Salt marsh harvest mouse); R. rodriguezi (Rodriguez's harvest mouse); R. spectabilis (Cozumel harvest mouse); R. sumichrasti (Sumichrast's harvest mouse); R. tenuirostris (Narrow-nosed harvest mouse); R. zacatecae (Zacatecas harvest mouse)	North America and Central America	Size range: 5 cm (2 in) long, plus 5 cm (2 in) tail (plains harvest mouse) to 13 cm (5 in) long, plus 13 cm (5 in) tail (narrow-nosed harvest mouse) Habitats: Desert, shrubland, grassland, forest, intertidal marine, and inland wetlands Diets: Seeds and shoots, as well as insects
Scotinomys (singing mouse)	Thomas, 1913 Two species: S. teguina (Alston's brown mouse, pictured); S. xerampelinus (Chiriqui brown mouse)	Southern Mexico and Central America	Size range: 6 cm (2 in) long, plus 4 cm (2 in) tail (Alston's brown mouse) to 9 cm (4 in) long, plus 8 cm (3 in) tail (Chiriqui brown mouse) Habitats: Grassland and forest Diets: Insects
Xenomys	Merriam, 1892 One species: X. nelsoni (Magdalena rat)	Southwestern Mexico	Size: 15–17 cm (6–7 in) long, plus 14–17 cm (6–7 in) tail Habitats: Forest Diet: Plant material and invertebrates

Subfamily Sigmodontinae – Wagner, 1843 – 87 genera
Name	Authority and species	Range	Size and ecology
Abrawayaomys	Cunha & Cruz, 1979 One species: A. ruschii (Ruschi's rat)	Southeastern Brazil	Size: 8–14 cm (3–6 in) long, plus 8–15 cm (3–6 in) tail Habitats: Forest Diet: Vegetation, seeds, and insects
Abrothrix (soft-haired mouse)	Waterhouse, 1837 Eight species: A. andinus (Andean Altiplano mouse); A. illuteus (Gray grass mouse); A. jelskii (Jelski's Altiplano mouse, pictured); A. lanosus (Woolly grass mouse); A. longipilis (Long-haired grass mouse); A. manni (Mann's grass mouse); A. olivaceus (Olive grass mouse); A. sanborni (Sanborn's grass mouse)	Western South America	Size range: 6 cm (2 in) long, plus 4 cm (2 in) tail (Andean Altiplano mouse) to 14 cm (6 in) long, plus 10 cm (4 in) tail (long-haired grass mouse) Habitats: Rocky areas, inland wetlands, grassland, forest, and shrubland Diets: Insects, berries, seeds, and fungi
Aegialomys (Galápagos rice rat)	Weksler, Percequillo, & Voss, 2006 Two species: A. galapagoensis (Galápagos rice rat, pictured); A. xanthaeolus (Yellowish rice rat)	Ecuador and western Peru	Size range: 10–16 cm (4–6 in) long, plus 12–18 cm (5–7 in) tail (Galápagos rice rat) Habitats: Desert, forest, and shrubland Diets: Grass, sedges, seeds, fruit, insects, crustaceans, and small fish
Aepeomys (montane mouse)	Thomas, 1898 Two species: A. lugens (Olive montane mouse); A. reigi (Reig's montane mouse)	Western Venezuela	Size range: 10–13 cm (4–5 in) long, plus 11–15 cm (4–6 in) tail (Reig's montane mouse) Habitats: Grassland, forest, and shrubland Diets: Vegetation, seeds, and insects
Akodon (grass mouse)	Meyen, 1833 39 species: A. aerosus (Highland grass mouse); A. affinis (Colombian grass mouse); A. albiventer (White-bellied grass mouse); A. azarae (Azara's grass mouse); A. boliviensis (Bolivian grass mouse); A. budini (Budin's grass mouse); A. caenosus (Unicolored grass mouse); A. cursor (Cursor grass mouse); A. dayi (Day's grass mouse); A. dolores (Dolorous grass mouse); A. fumeus (Smoky grass mouse); A. iniscatus (Intelligent grass mouse); A. juninensis (Junín grass mouse); A. kofordi (Koford's grass mouse); A. lindberghi (Lindbergh's grass mouse); A. lutescens (Altiplano grass mouse); A. mimus (Thespian grass mouse); A. molinae (Molina's grass mouse); A. mollis (Soft grass mouse, pictured); A. montensis (Montane grass mouse); A. mystax (Caparaó grass mouse); A. oenos (Monte grass mouse); A. orophilus (El Dorado grass mouse); A. paranaensis (Paraná grass mouse); A. pervalens (Tarija akodont); A. philipmyersi (Philip Myers's akodont); A. polopi (Polop's grass mouse); A. reigi (Reig's grass mouse); A. sanctipaulensis (São Paulo grass mouse); A. serrensis (Serra do Mar grass mouse); A. siberiae (Cochabamba grass mouse); A. simulator (White-throated grass mouse); A. spegazzinii (Spegazzini's grass mouse); A. subfuscus (Puno grass mouse); A. surdus (Silent grass mouse); A. sylvanus (Forest grass mouse); A. toba (Chaco grass mouse); A. torques (Cloud forest grass mouse); A. varius (Variable grass mouse)	South America	Size range: 6 cm (2 in) long, plus 4 cm (2 in) tail (Caparaó grass mouse) to 16 cm (6 in) long, plus 11 cm (4 in) tail (variable grass mouse) Habitats: Rocky areas, inland wetlands, savanna, grassland, forest, and shrubland Diets: Plants and invertebrates
Amphinectomys	Malygin, 1994 One species: A. savamis (Ucayali water rat)	Northern Peru	Size: 18–19 cm (7 in) long, plus 17–21 cm (7–8 in) tail Habitats: Inland wetlands and forest Diet: Unknown
Andalgalomys (chaco mouse)	Williams & Mares, 1978 Two species: A. olrogi (Olrog's chaco mouse); A. pearsoni (Pearson's chaco mouse)	Southern Bolivia, Paraguay, and Northern Argentina	Size range: 7 cm (3 in) long, plus 8 cm (3 in) tail (Olrog's chaco mouse) to 13 cm (5 in) long, plus 14 cm (6 in) tail (Pearson's chaco mouse) Habitats: Grassland and shrubland Diets: Grass, grain, and mesquite fruit
Andinomys	Thomas, 1902 One species: A. edax (Andean mouse)	Western South America	Size: 13–19 cm (5–7 in) long, plus 10–16 cm (4–6 in) tail Habitats: Grassland and shrubland Diet: Vegetation
Anotomys	, Genus Anotomys One species: A. leander (Aquatic rat)	Ecuador and Colombia	Size: 10–13 cm (4–5 in) long, plus 12–16 cm (5–6 in) tail Habitats: Inland wetlands, grassland, and forest Diet: Fish
Auliscomys (big-eared mouse)	Thomas, 1906 Three species: A. boliviensis (Bolivian big-eared mouse, pictured); A. pictus (Painted big-eared mouse); A. sublimis (Andean big-eared mouse)	Western South America	Size range: 9 cm (4 in) long, plus 4 cm (2 in) tail (Andean big-eared mouse) to 14 cm (6 in) long, plus 11 cm (4 in) tail (painted big-eared mouse) Habitats: Rocky areas, grassland, inland wetlands, and shrubland Diets: Seeds, vegetation, and lichen
Bibimys (crimson-nosed rat)	Massoia, 1979 Three species: B. chacoensis (Chaco crimson-nosed rat); B. labiosus (Large-lipped crimson-nosed rat, pictured); B. torresi (Torres's crimson-nosed rat)	Paraguay, Argentina, and southern Brazil	Size range: 7 cm (3 in) long, plus 6 cm (2 in) tail (large-lipped crimson-nosed rat) to 11 cm (4 in) long, plus 8 cm (3 in) tail (Torres's crimson-nosed rat) Habitats: Grassland, forest, inland wetlands, and shrubland Diets: Grass and seeds
Blarinomys	Thomas, 1896 One species: B. breviceps (Brazilian shrew mouse)	Northeastern Argentina and southern Brazil	Size: 9–13 cm (4–5 in) long, plus 3–6 cm (1–2 in) tail Habitats: Forest Diet: Insects and worms
Brucepattersonius (brucie)	Hershkovitz, 1998 Seven species: B. griserufescens (Gray-bellied akodont); B. guarani (Guaraní akodont); B. igniventris (Red-bellied akodont); B. iheringi (Ihering's akodont); B. misionensis (Misiones akodont); B. paradisus (Arroyo of Paradise brucie); B. soricinus (Soricine brucie)	Northeastern Argentina and southern Brazil	Size range: 8 cm (3 in) long, plus 8 cm (3 in) tail (Arroyo of Paradise brucie) to 13 cm (5 in) long, plus 10 cm (4 in) tail (red-bellied akodont) Habitats: Rocky areas and forest Diets: Vegetation, seeds, and insects
Calomys (vesper mouse)	Waterhouse, 1837 Thirteen species: C. boliviae (Bolivian vesper mouse); C. callidus (Crafty vesper mouse); C. callosus (Large vesper mouse); C. expulsus (Caatinga vesper mouse, pictured); C. fecundus (Fecund vesper mouse); C. hummelincki (Hummelinck's vesper mouse); C. laucha (Small vesper mouse); C. lepidus (Andean vesper mouse); C. musculinus (Drylands vesper mouse); C. sorellus (Peruvian vesper mouse); C. tener (Delicate vesper mouse); C. tocantinsi (Tocantins vesper mouse); C. venustus (Córdoba vesper mouse)	South America	Size range: 5 cm (2 in) long, plus 4 cm (2 in) tail (Hummelinck's vesper mouse) to 17 cm (7 in) long, plus 11 cm (4 in) tail (Córdoba vesper mouse) Habitats: Rocky areas, savanna, grassland, forest, and shrubland Diets: Vegetation and insects
Casiomys (Casio rice rat)	Voss, 2024 Six species: C. alfaroi (Alfaro's rice rat); C. chapmani (Chapman's rice rat); C. melanotis (Black-eared rice rat); C. rhabdops (Striped rice rat); C. rostratus (Long-nosed rice rat, pictured); C. saturatior (Cloud Forest rice rat)	Mexico, Central America, and northeastern South America	Size range: 8 cm (3 in) long, plus 9 cm (4 in) tail (black-eared rice rat) to 16 cm (6 in) long, plus 12 cm (5 in) tail (Chapman's rice rat) Habitats: Forest Diets: Grass, sedges, seeds, fruit, insects, crustaceans, and small fish
Cerradomys (Cerrado rice rat)	Weksler, Percequillo, & Voss, 2006 Four species: C. maracajuensis (Maracaju rice rat); C. marinhus (Marinho's rice rat); C. scotti (Lindbergh's rice rat); C. subflavus (Terraced rice rat)	South America	Size range: 12–19 cm (5–7 in) long, plus 14–20 cm (6–8 in) tail (Lindbergh's rice rat) Habitats: Inland wetlands, savanna, grassland, forest, and shrubland Diets: Vegetation, seeds, and insects
Chelemys (long-clawed mouse)	Thomas, 1903 Two species: C. macronyx (Andean long-clawed mouse); C. megalonyx (Large long-clawed mouse, pictured)	Chile and southwestern Argentina	Size range: 10–15 cm (4–6 in) long, plus 4–7 cm (2–3 in) tail (Andean long-clawed mouse) Habitats: Grassland, forest, and shrubland Diets: Arthropods, vegetation, and fungi
Chibchanomys (water mouse)	Voss, 1988 Two species: C. orcesi (Las Cajas water mouse); C. trichotis (Chibchan water mouse)	Northwestern South America	Size range: 10 cm (4 in) long, plus 10 cm (4 in) tail (Las Cajas water mouse) to 13 cm (5 in) long, plus 14 cm (6 in) tail (Chibchan water mouse) Habitats: Grassland, forest, and inland wetlands Diets: Aquatic invertebrates and small animals
Chilomys	Thomas, 1897 One species: C. instans (Colombian forest mouse)	Northwestern South America	Size: 8–10 cm (3–4 in) long, plus 10–13 cm (4–5 in) tail Habitats: Forest Diet: Omnivorous
Chinchillula	Thomas, 1898 One species: C. sahamae (Altiplano chinchilla mouse)	Western South America	Size: 15–17 cm (6–7 in) long, plus 9–11 cm (4 in) tail Habitats: Shrubland and rocky areas Diet: Vegetation
Delomys (Atlantic Forest rat)	Thomas, 1917 Three species: D. collinus (Montane Atlantic Forest rat); D. dorsalis (Striped Atlantic Forest rat, pictured); D. sublineatus (Pallid Atlantic Forest rat)	Southeastern South America	Size range: 10 cm (4 in) long, plus 10 cm (4 in) tail (montane Atlantic Forest rat) to 15 cm (6 in) long, plus 13 cm (5 in) tail (pallid Atlantic Forest rat) Habitats: Grassland and forest Diets: Vegetation, seeds, and insects
Deltamys	Thomas, 1917 One species: D. kempi (Kemp's grass mouse)	Southeastern South America	Size: About 10 cm (4 in) Habitats: Inland wetlands and grassland Diet: Plants and invertebrates
Drymoreomys	Percequillo, Weksler, & Costa, 2011 One species: D. albimaculatus (White-throated montane forest rat)	Southeastern Brazil	Size: 11–15 cm (4–6 in) long, plus 14–18 cm (6–7 in) tail Habitats: Forest Diet: Vegetation, seeds, and insects
Eligmodontia (gerbil mouse)	F. Cuvier, 1837 Four species: E. moreni (Monte gerbil mouse); E. morgani (Morgan's gerbil mouse); E. puerulus (Andean gerbil mouse); E. typus (Lowland gerbil mouse)	Western South America	Size range: 6–10 cm (2–4 in) long, plus 5–10 cm (2–4 in) tail (Andean gerbil mouse) Habitats: Desert, grassland, and shrubland Diets: Grain, vegetation, and insects
Eremoryzomys	Weksler, Percequillo, & Voss, 2006 One species: E. polius (Gray rice rat)	Northern Peru and southern Ecuador	Size: 14–18 cm (6–7 in) long, plus 16–21 cm (6–8 in) tail Habitats: Forest Diet: Vegetation, seeds, and insects
Euneomys (chinchilla mouse)	Coues, 1874 Four species: E. chinchilloides (Patagonian chinchilla mouse, pictured); E. fossor (Burrowing chinchilla mouse); E. mordax (Biting chinchilla mouse); E. petersoni (Peterson's chinchilla mouse)	Chile and Argentina	Size range: 7–16 cm (3–6 in) long, plus 4–9 cm (2–4 in) tail (Patagonian chinchilla mouse) Habitats: Rocky areas, grassland, forest, and shrubland Diets: Vegetation
Euryoryzomys (broad rice rat)	Weksler, Percequillo, & Voss, 2006 Six species: E. emmonsae (Emmons' rice rat); E. lamia (Monster rice rat); E. legatus (Big-headed rice rat); E. macconnelli (MacConnell's rice rat); E. nitidus (Elegant rice rat, pictured); E. russatus (Russet rice rat)	South America	Size range: 9–18 cm (4–7 in) long, plus 9–19 cm (4–7 in) tail (Russet rice rat) Habitats: Savanna and forest Diets: Grass, sedges, seeds, fruit, insects, crustaceans, and small fish
Galenomys	Thomas, 1916 One species: G. garleppi (Garlepp's mouse)	Western South America	Size: 10–14 cm (4–6 in) long, plus 3–5 cm (1–2 in) tail Habitats: Grassland Diet: Seeds, vegetation, and lichen
Geoxus (long-clawed mole mouse)	Thomas, 1919 Two species: G. annectens (Pearson's long-clawed akodont); G. valdivianus (Long-clawed mole mouse, pictured)	Chile and southern Argentina	Size range: 9 cm (4 in) long, plus 3 cm (1 in) tail (long-clawed mole mouse) to 13 cm (5 in) long, plus 9 cm (4 in) tail (Pearson's long-clawed akodont) Habitats: Forest and shrubland Diets: Worms, insects, and other arthropods
Graomys (gray leaf-eared mouse)	Thomas, 1916 Four species: G. chacoensis (Central leaf-eared mouse); G. domorum (Pale leaf-eared mouse); G. edithae (Edith's leaf-eared mouse); G. griseoflavus (Gray leaf-eared mouse, pictured)	Central and southern South America	Size range: 10 cm (4 in) long, plus 14 cm (6 in) tail (pale leaf-eared mouse) to 17 cm (7 in) long, plus 18 cm (7 in) tail (gray leaf-eared mouse) Habitats: Grassland, forest, and shrubland Diets: Grass, grain, and mesquite fruit
Gyldenstolpia	Pardiñas, D'Elía, & Teta, 2009 One species: G. fronto (Fossorial giant rat)	Southern Paraguay and northern Argentina	Size: About 22 cm (9 in) Habitats: Inland wetlands and savanna Diet: Vegetation, seeds, and insects
Handleyomys (Handley's rice rat)	Voss, Gómez-Laverde, & Pacheco, 2002 Two species: H. fuscatus (Dusky-footed Handley's mouse); H. intectus (Colombian rice rat)	Northwestern Colombia	Size range: 8 cm (3 in) long, plus 7 cm (3 in) tail (Colombian rice rat) to 13 cm (5 in) long, plus 11 cm (4 in) tail (dusky-footed Handley's mouse) Habitats: Forest Diets: Vegetation, seeds, and insects
Holochilus (marsh rat)	Brandt, 1835 Three species: H. brasiliensis (Brazilian marsh rat, pictured); H. chacarius (Chacoan marsh rat); H. sciureus (Amazonian marsh rat)	South America	Size range: 13 cm (5 in) long, plus 12 cm (5 in) tail (Amazonian marsh rat) to 24 cm (9 in) long, plus 24 cm (9 in) tail (Brazilian marsh rat) Habitats: Grassland, forest, inland wetlands, and shrubland Diets: Marsh plants and molluscs
Hylaeamys (forest rice rat)	Weksler, Percequillo, & Voss, 2006 Eight species: H. acritus (Bolivian rice rat); H. laticeps (Atlantic forest oryzomys); H. megacephalus (Azara's broad-headed oryzomys, pictured); H. oniscus (Sowbug rice rat); H. perenensis (Western Amazonian rice rat); H. seuanezi (Atlantic Forest rice rat); H. tatei (Tate's rice rat); H. yunganus (Yungas rice rat)	South America	Size range: 8 cm (3 in) long, plus 9 cm (4 in) tail (Azara's broad-headed oryzomys) to 18 cm (7 in) long, plus 16 cm (6 in) tail (Atlantic Forest rice rat) Habitats: Inland wetlands, savanna, grassland, and forest Diets: Vegetation, seeds, and insects
Ichthyomys (crab-eating rat)	Thomas, 1893 Four species: I. hydrobates (Crab-eating rat, pictured); I. pittieri (Pittier's crab-eating rat); I. stolzmanni (Stolzmann's crab-eating rat); I. tweedii (Tweedy's crab-eating rat)	Northwestern South America	Size range: 9 cm (4 in) long, plus 8 cm (3 in) tail (Pittier's crab-eating rat) to 20 cm (8 in) long, plus 16 cm (6 in) tail (Tweedy's crab-eating rat) Habitats: Forest and inland wetlands Diets: Fish, crabs, and aquatic insects
Irenomys	Thomas, 1919 One species: I. tarsalis (Chilean climbing mouse)	Southern Chile and southwestern Argentina	Size: 10–13 cm (4–5 in) long, plus 16–20 cm (6–8 in) tail Habitats: Shrubland and forest Diet: Fruit, seeds, and vegetation
Juliomys (Atlantic Forest tree mouse)	González, 2000 Two species: J. pictipes (Lesser Wilfred's mouse); J. rimofrons (Montane red-rumped tree mouse, pictured)	Southern Brazil and northeastern Argentina	Size range: 8 cm (3 in) long, plus 9 cm (4 in) tail (montane red-rumped tree mouse) to 11 cm (4 in) long, plus 12 cm (5 in) tail (lesser Wilfred's mouse) Habitats: Forest Diets: Vegetation, seeds, and insects
Juscelinomys (Brazilian burrowing mouse)	Oliveira, 1965 Two species: J. candango † (Candango mouse, pictured); J. huanchacae (Huanchaca mouse)	Northeastern Bolivia and Brazil	Size range: 13–20 cm (5–8 in) long, plus 8–10 cm (3–4 in) tail (Huanchaca mouse) Habitats: Savanna, and grassland Diets: Vegetation and insects
Kunsia	Hershkovitz, 1966 One species: K. tomentosus (Woolly giant rat)	Northern Bolivia and western Brazil	Size: 18–29 cm (7–11 in) long, plus 14–20 cm (6–8 in) tail Habitats: Grassland Diet: Roots and grass
Lenoxus	Thomas, 1909 One species: L. apicalis (Andean rat)	Southern Peru and western Bolivia	Size: 11–17 cm (4–7 in) long, plus 13–19 cm (5–7 in) tail Habitats: Forest Diet: Vegetation, seeds, and insects
Loxodontomys (big-eared mouse)	Osgood, 1947 Two species: L. micropus (Southern big-eared mouse, pictured); L. pikumche (Pikumche pericote)	Chile and southwestern Argentina	Size range: 9–15 cm (4–6 in) long, plus 8–12 cm (3–5 in) tail (Pikumche pericote) Habitats: Shrubland Diets: Vegetation, fungi, and flowers
Lundomys	Voss & Carleton, 1993 One species: L. molitor (Lund's amphibious rat)	Uruguay and southern Brazil	Size: 17–24 cm (7–9 in) long, plus 19–29 cm (7–11 in) tail Habitats: Inland wetlands, forest, and grassland Diet: Vegetation
Megalomys † (pilorie)	Trouessart, 1881 Two species: M. desmarestii † (Desmarest's pilorie, pictured); M. luciae † (Saint Lucia pilorie)	Martinique and St. Lucia	Size range: Unknown Habitats: Unknown Diets: Unknown
Megaoryzomys †	Lenglet & Coppois, 1979 One species: M. curioi † (Galápagos giant rat)	Santa Cruz island of the Galápagos Islands	Size: Unknown Habitats: Shrubland Diet: Unknown
Melanomys (dark rice rat)	Thomas, 1902 Three species: M. caliginosus (Dusky rice rat, pictured); M. robustulus (Robust dark rice rat); M. zunigae (Zuniga's dark rice rat)	Central America and northwestern South America	Size range: 10–14 cm (4–6 in) long, plus 7–12 cm (3–5 in) tail (dusky rice rat) Habitats: Desert, forest, and shrubland Diets: Grass, sedges, seeds, fruit, insects, crustaceans, and small fish
Microakodontomys	Hershkovitz, 1993 One species: M. transitorius (Transitional colilargo)	Central Brazil	Size: About 7 cm (3 in) Habitats: Shrubland and grassland Diet: Vegetation, seeds, and insects
Microryzomys (colilargo)	Thomas, 1917 Two species: M. altissimus (Páramo colilargo); M. minutus (Montane colilargo)	Northwestern South America	Size range: 6–10 cm (2–4 in) long, plus 11–13 cm (4–5 in) tail (montane colilargo) Habitats: Rocky areas, grassland, and forest Diets: Seeds and vegetation
Mindomys	Weksler, Percequillo, & Voss, 2006 One species: M. hammondi (Hammond's rice rat)	Ecuador	Size: 17–29 cm (7–11 in) long, plus 22–25 cm (9–10 in) tail Habitats: Forest Diet: Grass, sedges, seeds, fruit, insects, crustaceans, and small fish
Neacomys (bristly mouse)	Thomas, 1900 Eight species: N. dubosti (Dubost's bristly mouse); N. guianae (Guiana bristly mouse); N. minutus (Small bristly mouse); N. musseri (Musser's bristly mouse); N. paracou (Paracou bristly mouse); N. pictus (Painted bristly mouse); N. spinosus (Common bristly mouse, pictured); N. tenuipes (Narrow-footed bristly mouse)	Eastern Panama and South America	Size range: 6 cm (2 in) long, plus 7 cm (3 in) tail (Dubost's bristly mouse) to 11 cm (4 in) long, plus 13 cm (5 in) tail (common bristly mouse) Habitats: Forest Diets: Seeds, insects, and fruit
Necromys (bolo mouse)	Ameghino, 1889 Nine species: N. amoenus (Pleasant bolo mouse); N. benefactus (Argentine bolo mouse); N. lactens (Rufous-bellied bolo mouse); N. lasiurus (Hairy-tailed bolo mouse, pictured); N. lenguarum (Paraguayan bolo mouse); N. obscurus (Dark bolo mouse); N. punctulatus (Spotted bolo mouse); N. temchuki (Temchuk's bolo mouse); N. urichi (Northern grass mouse)	South America	Size range: 9 cm (4 in) long, plus 6 cm (2 in) tail (pleasant bolo mouse) to 15 cm (6 in) long, plus 11 cm (4 in) tail (northern grass mouse) Habitats: Inland wetlands, savanna, grassland, forest, and shrubland Diets: Arthropods
Nectomys (water rat)	Peters, 1861 Five species: N. apicalis (Western Amazonian water rat); N. magdalenae (Magdalena water rat); N. palmipes (Trinidad water rat); N. rattus (Common water rat); N. squamipes (South American water rat, pictured)	South America and Trinidad and Tobago	Size range: 11 cm (4 in) long, plus 12 cm (5 in) tail (South American water rat) to 29 cm (11 in) long, plus 25 cm (10 in) tail (common water rat) Habitats: Inland wetlands, savanna, grassland, forest, and shrubland Diets: Vegetation, insects, tadpoles, and small fish
Neomicroxus (small grass mouse)	Alvarado-Serrano & D'Elía, 2013 Two species: N. bogotensis (Bogotá grass mouse); N. latebricola (Ecuadorian grass mouse)	Northwestern South America	Size range: 7 cm (3 in) long, plus 6 cm (2 in) tail (Bogotá grass mouse) to 11 cm (4 in) long, plus 10 cm (4 in) tail (Ecuadorian grass mouse) Habitats: Grassland, forest, and shrubland Diets: Vegetation, seeds, and insects
Neotomys	Thomas, 1894 One species: N. ebriosus (Andean swamp rat)	Western South America	Size: 9–15 cm (4–6 in) long, plus 6–9 cm (2–4 in) tail Habitats: Inland wetlands, shrubland, and grassland Diet: Vegetation, seeds, and insects
Nephelomys (misty rice rat)	Weksler, Percequillo, & Voss, 2006 Seven species: N. albigularis (Tomes's rice rat); N. auriventer (Ecuadorian rice rat); N. caracolus (Caracol rice rat); N. devius (Boquete rice rat, pictured); N. keaysi (Keays's rice rat); N. levipes (Light-footed rice rat); N. meridensis (Mérida rice rat)	Central America and Northwestern South America	Size range: 10 cm (4 in) long, plus 13 cm (5 in) tail (Tomes's rice rat) to 18 cm (7 in) long, plus 20 cm (8 in) tail (Ecuadorian rice rat) Habitats: Grassland and forest Diets: Grass, sedges, seeds, fruit, insects, crustaceans, and small fish
Nesoryzomys (Galápagos mouse)	Heller, 1904 Five species: N. darwini † (Darwin's Galápagos mouse); N. fernandinae (Fernandina Galápagos mouse); N. indefessus † (Indefatigable Galápagos mouse); N. narboroughi (Large Fernandina Galápagos mouse); N. swarthi (Santiago Galápagos mouse)	Galápagos Islands	Size range: 10 cm (4 in) long, plus 7 cm (3 in) tail (Fernandina Galápagos mouse) to 19 cm (7 in) long, plus 17 cm (7 in) tail (Santiago Galápagos mouse) Habitats: Grassland, forest, and shrubland Diets: Grass, sedges, seeds, fruit, insects, crustaceans, and small fish
Neusticomys (fish-eating rat)	Anthony, 1921 Six species: N. ferreirai (Ferreira's fish-eating rat); N. monticolus (Montane fish-eating rat, pictured); N. mussoi (Peruvian fish-eating rat); N. oyapocki (Oyapock's fish-eating rat); N. peruviensis (Peruvian fish-eating rat); N. venezuelae (Venezuelan fish-eating rat)	Northern South America	Size range: 9–21 cm (4–8 in) long, plus 8–12 cm (3–5 in) tail (montane fish-eating rat) Habitats: Savanna, forest, and inland wetlands Diets: Aquatic invertebrates
Noronhomys †	Olson & Carleton, 1999 One species: N. vespuccii † (Vespucci's rodent)	Fernando de Noronha islands northeast of Brazil	Size: Unknown Habitats: Shrubland Diet: Vegetation, seeds, and insects
Notiomys	Thomas, 1890 One species: N. edwardsii (Edwards's long-clawed mouse)	Southern Argentina	Size: 8–12 cm (3–5 in) long, plus 3–5 cm (1–2 in) tail Habitats: Shrubland, grassland, and rocky areas Diet: Insects and seeds
Oecomys (arboreal rice rat)	Thomas, 1906 Fifteen species: O. auyantepui (North Amazonian arboreal rice rat); O. bicolor (Bicolored arboreal rice rat); O. catherinae (Atlantic Forest arboreal rice rat); O. cleberi (Cleber's arboreal rice rat); O. concolor (Unicolored arboreal rice rat); O. flavicans (Yellow arboreal rice rat); O. mamorae (Mamore arboreal rice rat); O. paricola (Brazilian arboreal rice rat); O. phaeotis (Dusky arboreal rice rat); O. rex (King arboreal rice rat); O. roberti (Robert's arboreal rice rat); O. rutilus (Red arboreal rice rat); O. speciosus (Venezuelan arboreal rice rat); O. superans (Foothill arboreal rice rat); O. trinitatis (Trinidad arboreal rice rat)	South America	Size range: 7 cm (3 in) long, plus 8 cm (3 in) tail (red arboreal rice rat) to 17 cm (7 in) long, plus 19 cm (7 in) tail (foothill arboreal rice rat) Habitats: Inland wetlands, savanna, grassland, forest, and shrubland Diets: Grass, sedges, seeds, fruit, insects, crustaceans, and small fish
Oligoryzomys (pygmy rice rat)	Bangs, 1900 20 species: O. andinus (Andean pygmy rice rat); O. arenalis (Sandy pygmy rice rat); O. brendae (Brenda's pygmy rice rat); O. chacoensis (Chacoan pygmy rice rat); O. delticola (Delta pygmy rice rat); O. destructor (Destructive pygmy rice rat); O. eliurus (Brazilian pygmy rice rat); O. flavescens (Yellow pygmy rice rat); O. fornesi (Fornes' pygmy rice rat); O. fulvescens (Fulvous pygmy rice rat); O. griseolus (Grayish pygmy rice rat); O. longicaudatus (Long-tailed pygmy rice rat); O. magellanicus (Magellanic pygmy rice rat); O. microtis (Small-eared pygmy rice rat, pictured); O. moojeni (Moojen's pygmy rice rat); O. nigripes (Black-footed pygmy rice rat); O. rupestris (Highlands pygmy rice rat); O. stramineus (Straw-colored pygmy rice rat); O. vegetus (Sprightly pygmy rice rat); O. victus † (St. Vincent pygmy rice rat)	Central America and South America	Size range: 7–12 cm (3–5 in) long, plus 10–15 cm (4–6 in) tail (black-footed pygmy rice rat) Habitats: Inland wetlands, savanna, grassland, forest, desert, and shrubland Diets: Seeds, fruit, and insects
Oreoryzomys	Weksler, Percequillo, & Voss, 2006 One species: O. balneator (Peruvian rice rat)	Ecuador and northwestern Peru	Size: 7–10 cm (3–4 in) long, plus 9–12 cm (4–5 in) tail Habitats: Forest Diet: Vegetation, seeds, and insects
Oryzomys (rice rat)	Baird, 1857 Six species: O. antillarum † (Jamaican rice rat); O. couesi (Coues's rice rat); O. dimidiatus (Thomas's rice rat); O. gorgasi (Gorgas's rice rat); O. nelsoni † (Nelson's rice rat); O. palustris (Marsh rice rat)	North America, Central America, South America, and Jamaica	Size range: 9 cm (4 in) long, plus 10 cm (4 in) tail (Coues's rice rat) to 16 cm (6 in) long, plus 14 cm (6 in) tail (Gorgas's rice rat) Habitats: Inland wetlands, grassland, forest, intertidal marine, and shrubland Diets: Grass, sedges, seeds, fruit, insects, crustaceans, and small fish
Oxymycterus (hocicudo)	Waterhouse, 1837 Seventeen species: O. akodontius (Argentine hocicudo); O. amazonicus (Amazonian hocicudo); O. angularis (Angular hocicudo); O. caparoae (Caparaó hocicudo); O. dasytrichus (Atlantic Forest hocicudo, pictured); O. delator (Spy hocicudo); O. hiska (Small hocicudo); O. hispidus (Hispid hocicudo); O. hucucha (Quechuan hocicudo); O. inca (Incan hocicudo); O. josei (Cook's hocicudo); O. nasutus (Long-nosed hocicudo); O. paramensis (Paramo hocicudo); O. quaestor (Quaestor hocicudo); O. roberti (Robert's hocicudo); O. rufus (Red hocicudo); O. wayku (Ravine hocicudo)	South America	Size range: 8 cm (3 in) long, plus 10 cm (4 in) tail (Robert's hocicudo) to 20 cm (8 in) long, plus 16 cm (6 in) tail (angular hocicudo) Habitats: Inland wetlands, savanna, grassland, forest, and shrubland Diets: Insects, as well as other invertebrates and vegetation
Phaenomys	Thomas, 1917 One species: P. ferrugineus (Rio de Janeiro arboreal rat)	Southeastern Brazil	Size: 14–17 cm (6–7 in) long, plus 18–20 cm (7–8 in) tail Habitats: Forest Diet: Vegetation, seeds, and insects
Phyllotis (leaf-eared mouse)	Waterhouse, 1837 Sixteen species: P. alisosiensis (Los Alisos leaf-eared mouse); P. amicus (Friendly leaf-eared mouse); P. andium (Andean leaf-eared mouse); P. anitae (Anita's leaf-eared mouse); P. bonariensis (Buenos Aires leaf-eared mouse); P. caprinus (Capricorn leaf-eared mouse); P. darwini (Darwin's leaf-eared mouse, pictured); P. definitus (Definitive leaf-eared mouse); P. gerbillus (Gerbil leaf-eared mouse); P. haggardi (Haggard's leaf-eared mouse); P. limatus (Lima leaf-eared mouse); P. magister (Master leaf-eared mouse); P. osgoodi (Osgood's leaf-eared mouse); P. osilae (Bunchgrass leaf-eared mouse); P. wolffsohni (Wolffsohn's leaf-eared mouse); P. xanthopygus (Yellow-rumped leaf-eared mouse)	Western and southern South America	Size range: 7 cm (3 in) long, plus 6 cm (2 in) tail (gerbil leaf-eared mouse) to 16 cm (6 in) long, plus 15 cm (6 in) tail (Buenos Aires leaf-eared mouse) Habitats: Rocky areas, inland wetlands, grassland, forest, desert, and shrubland Diets: Seeds, vegetation, and lichen
Podoxymys	Anthony, 1929 One species: P. roraimae (Roraima mouse)	Northern South America	Size: 7–11 cm (3–4 in) long, plus 7–11 cm (3–4 in) tail Habitats: Forest Diet: Vegetation, seeds, and insects
Pseudoryzomys	Hershkovitz, 1962 One species: P. simplex (Brazilian false rice rat)	Central and eastern South America	Size: 9–13 cm (4–5 in) long, plus 10–14 cm (4–6 in) tail Habitats: Grassland, savanna, and shrubland Diet: Grass, sedges, seeds, fruit, insects, crustaceans, and small fish
Punomys (puna mouse)	Osgood, 1943 Two species: P. kofordi (Eastern puna mouse); P. lemminus (Puna mouse)	Western South America	Size range: 12–17 cm (5–7 in) long, plus 6–9 cm (2–4 in) tail (eastern puna mouse) Habitats: Rocky areas, grassland, and shrubland Diets: Twigs from herbs
Reithrodon (bunny rat)	Waterhouse, 1837 Two species: R. auritus (Bunny rat, pictured); R. typicus (Naked-soled conyrat)	Southeastern South America	Size range: 12–15 cm (5–6 in) long, plus 7–10 cm (3–4 in) tail (bunny rat) Habitats: Grassland and shrubland Diets: Grass, rhizomes, and roots
Rhagomys (arboreal mouse)	Thomas, 1917 Two species: R. longilingua (Long-tongued arboreal mouse); R. rufescens (Brazilian arboreal mouse)	Southern South America	Size range: 8 cm (3 in) long, plus 8 cm (3 in) tail (Brazilian arboreal mouse) to 11 cm (4 in) long, plus 11 cm (4 in) tail (long-tongued arboreal mouse) Habitats: Forest Diets: Vegetation, seeds, and insects
Rheomys (water mouse)	Thomas, 1906 Four species: R. mexicanus (Mexican water mouse); R. raptor (Goldman's water mouse); R. thomasi (Thomas's water mouse); R. underwoodi (Underwood's water mouse, pictured)	Southern Mexico and Central America	Size range: 9 cm (4 in) long, plus 8 cm (3 in) tail (Goldman's water mouse) to 15 cm (6 in) long, plus 18 cm (7 in) tail (Mexican water mouse) Habitats: Forest and inland wetlands Diets: Fish, snails, and aquatic insects
Rhipidomys (climbing mouse)	Tschudi, 1845 22 species: R. albujai (Albuja's climbing rat); R. austrinus (Southern climbing mouse); R. cariri (Cariri climbing mouse); R. caucensis (Cauca climbing mouse, pictured); R. couesi (Coues's climbing mouse); R. emiliae (Eastern Amazon climbing mouse); R. fulviventer (Buff-bellied climbing mouse); R. gardneri (Gardner's climbing mouse); R. ipukensis (Ipuca climbing rat); R. itoan (Sky climbing rat); R. latimanus (Broad-footed climbing mouse); R. leucodactylus (White-footed climbing mouse); R. macconnelli (MacConnell's climbing mouse); R. macrurus (Cerrado climbing mouse); R. mastacalis (Atlantic Forest climbing mouse); R. modicus (Peruvian climbing mouse); R. nitela (Splendid climbing mouse); R. ochrogaster (Yellow-bellied climbing mouse); R. tribei (Tribe's climbing rat); R. venezuelae (Venezuelan climbing mouse); R. venustus (Charming climbing mouse); R. wetzeli (Wetzel's climbing mouse)	Panama and South America	Size range: 6 cm (2 in) long, plus 8 cm (3 in) tail (Wetzel's climbing mouse) to 21 cm (8 in) long, plus 20 cm (8 in) tail (Coues's climbing mouse) Habitats: Rocky areas, savanna, grassland, and forest Diets: Vegetation, seeds, and insects
Salinomys	Braun & Mares, 1995 One species: S. delicatus (Delicate salt flat mouse)	Northern Argentina	Size: 6–9 cm (2–4 in) long, plus 9–13 cm (4–5 in) tail Habitats: Shrubland and inland wetlands Diet: Seeds, arthropods, and vegetation
Scapteromys (swamp rat)	Waterhouse, 1837 Two species: S. aquaticus (Argentine swamp rat, pictured); S. tumidus (Waterhouse's swamp rat)	Southern South America	Size range: 12–25 cm (5–10 in) long, plus 10–15 cm (4–6 in) tail (Argentine swamp rat) Habitats: Grassland, forest, inland wetlands, and shrubland Diets: Grass and seeds
Scolomys (spiny mouse)	Anthony, 1924 Two species: S. melanops (South American spiny mouse); S. ucayalensis (Ucayali spiny mouse)	Western South America	Size range: 8 cm (3 in) long, plus 5 cm (2 in) tail (South American spiny mouse) to 12 cm (5 in) long, plus 8 cm (3 in) tail (Ucayali spiny mouse) Habitats: Forest Diets: Seeds and invertebrates
Sigmodon (cotton rat)	Say & Ord, 1825 Fourteen species: S. alleni (Allen's cotton rat); S. alstoni (Alston's cotton rat); S. arizonae (Arizona cotton rat); S. fulviventer (Tawny-bellied cotton rat); S. hirsutus (Southern cotton rat); S. hispidus (Hispid cotton rat); S. inopinatus (Unexpected cotton rat); S. leucotis (White-eared cotton rat, pictured); S. mascotensis (Jaliscan cotton rat); S. ochrognathus (Yellow-nosed cotton rat); S. peruanus (Peruvian cotton rat); S. planifrons (Miahuatlán cotton rat); S. toltecus (Toltec cotton rat); S. zanjonensis (Montane cotton rat)	North America, Central America, and Northern South America	Size range: 10 cm (4 in) long, plus 7 cm (3 in) tail (Alston's cotton rat) to 24 cm (9 in) long, plus 16 cm (6 in) tail (Arizona cotton rat) Habitats: Inland wetlands, grassland, forest, desert, and shrubland Diets: Omnivorous, including vegetation, insects, invertebrates, and small animals
Sigmodontomys	Allen, 1897 One species: S. alfari (Alfaro's rice water rat)	Central America and northwestern South America	Size: 12–18 cm (5–7 in) long, plus 14–19 cm (6–7 in) tail Habitats: Inland wetlands and forest Diet: Seeds and vegetation
Sooretamys	Weksler, Percequillo, & Voss, 2006 One species: S. angouya (Rat-headed rice rat)	Southeastern South America	Size: 12–21 cm (5–8 in) long, plus 16–24 cm (6–9 in) tail Habitats: Forest and savanna Diet: Vegetation, seeds, and insects
Tanyuromys	Pine, Timm, & Weksler, 2012 One species: T. aphrastus (Harris's rice water rat)	Southern Central America and northwestern South America	Size: 11–16 cm (4–6 in) long, plus 17–23 cm (7–9 in) tail Habitats: Forest Diet: Vegetation, seeds, and insects
Tapecomys	Anderson & Yates, 2000 One species: T. primus (Primordial tapecua)	Southern Bolivia and northern Argentina	Size: 12–16 cm (5–6 in) long, plus 14–16 cm (6 in) tail Habitats: Forest Diet: Vegetation, seeds, and insects
Thalpomys (cerrado mouse)	Thomas, 1916 Two species: T. cerradensis (Cerrado mouse, pictured); T. lasiotis (Hairy-eared cerrado mouse)	Brazil	Size range: 8 cm (3 in) long, plus 5 cm (2 in) tail (hairy-eared cerrado mouse) to 11 cm (4 in) long, plus 7 cm (3 in) tail (Cerrado mouse) Habitats: Savanna, grassland, and shrubland Diets: Vegetation, seeds, and insects
Thaptomys	Thomas, 1916 One species: T. nigrita (Blackish grass mouse)	Southeastern South America	Size: 8–10 cm (3–4 in) long, plus 3–5 cm (1–2 in) tail Habitats: Grassland, shrubland, and forest Diet: Plants and invertebrates
Thomasomys (Oldfield mouse)	Coues, 1884 42 species: T. andersoni (Anderson's Oldfield mouse); T. apeco (Apeco Oldfield mouse); T. aureus (Golden Oldfield mouse); T. auricularis (Red Andean Oldfield mouse); T. australis (Austral Oldfield mouse); T. baeops (Beady-eyed mouse); T. bombycinus (Silky Oldfield mouse); T. caudivarius (White-tipped Oldfield mouse); T. cinereiventer (Ashy-bellied Oldfield mouse); T. cinereus (Ash-colored Oldfield mouse); T. cinnameus (Cinnamon-colored Oldfield mouse); T. contradictus (Central Andes Oldfield mouse); T. daphne (Daphne's Oldfield mouse); T. dispar (Colombian Oldfield mouse); T. eleusis (Peruvian Oldfield mouse); T. emeritus (Venezuelan Oldfield mouse); T. erro (Wandering Oldfield mouse); T. fumeus (Smoky Oldfield mouse); T. gracilis (Slender Oldfield mouse); T. hudsoni (Hudson's Oldfield mouse); T. hylophilus (Woodland Oldfield mouse); T. incanus (Inca Oldfield mouse); T. ischyrus (Strong-tailed Oldfield mouse); T. kalinowskii (Kalinowski's Oldfield mouse); T. ladewi (Ladew's Oldfield mouse); T. laniger (Soft-furred Oldfield mouse); T. macrotis (Large-eared Oldfield mouse); T. monochromos (Unicolored Oldfield mouse); T. niveipes (Snow-footed Oldfield mouse); T. notatus (Distinguished Oldfield mouse); T. onkiro (Ashaninka Oldfield mouse); T. oreas (Montane Oldfield mouse); T. paramorum (Paramo Oldfield mouse); T. popayanus (Popayán Oldfield mouse); T. praetor (Cajamarca Oldfield mouse); T. pyrrhonotus (Thomas's Oldfield mouse); T. rosalinda (Rosalinda's Oldfield mouse); T. silvestris (Forest Oldfield mouse); T. taczanowskii (Taczanowski's Oldfield mouse, pictured); T. ucucha (Ucucha Oldfield mouse); T. vestitus (Dressy Oldfield mouse); T. vulcani (Pichincha Oldfield mouse)	Northwestern South America	Size range: 8 cm (3 in) long, plus 14 cm (6 in) tail (Austral Oldfield mouse) to 24 cm (9 in) long, plus 33 cm (13 in) tail (Apeco Oldfield mouse) Habitats: Rocky areas, inland wetlands, grassland, forest, and shrubland Diets: Vegetation, seeds, and insects
Transandinomys (transandean rice rat)	Weksler, Percequillo, & Voss, 2006 Two species: T. bolivaris (Long-whiskered rice rat); T. talamancae (Talamancan rice rat)	Central America and northwestern South America	Size range: 10 cm (4 in) long, plus 9 cm (4 in) tail (long-whiskered rice rat) to 16 cm (6 in) long, plus 16 cm (6 in) tail (Talamancan rice rat) Habitats: Forest and inland wetlands Diets: Grass, sedges, seeds, fruit, insects, crustaceans, and small fish
Wiedomys (red-nosed mouse)	Hershkovitz, 1959 Two species: W. cerradensis (Cerrado red-nosed mouse, pictured); W. pyrrhorhinos (Red-nosed mouse)	Eastern Brazil	Size range: 10 cm (4 in) long, plus 14 cm (6 in) tail (Cerrado red-nosed mouse) to 12 cm (5 in) long, plus 19 cm (7 in) tail (red-nosed mouse) Habitats: Savanna, grassland, forest, and shrubland Diets: Seeds and insects
Wilfredomys	Avila-Pires, 1960 One species: W. oenax (Greater Wilfred's mouse)	Southeastern South America	Size: 11–13 cm (4–5 in) long, plus 16–21 cm (6–8 in) tail Habitats: Forest Diet: Vegetation, seeds, and insects
Zygodontomys (cane mouse)	Allen, 1897 Two species: Z. brevicauda (Short-tailed cane mouse); Z. brunneus (Brown cane mouse)	Southern Central America and northern South America	Size range: 13 cm (5 in) long, plus 11 cm (4 in) tail (brown cane mouse) to 17 cm (7 in) long, plus 12 cm (5 in) tail (short-tailed cane mouse) Habitats: Savanna, grassland, forest, and inland wetlands Diets: Seeds, grass, and fruit

Subfamily Tylomyinae – Reig, 1984 – four genera
Name	Authority and species	Range	Size and ecology
Nyctomys	Saussure, 1860 One species: N. sumichrasti (Sumichrast's vesper rat)	Southern Mexico, Central America	Size: 12–14 cm (5–6 in) long, plus 14–16 cm (6 in) tail Habitats: Forest Diet: Seeds, fruit, and other vegetation
Otonyctomys	Anthony, 1932 One species: O. hatti (Hatt's vesper rat)	Eastern Mexico and northern Central America	Size: 9–12 cm (4–5 in) long, plus 6–13 cm (2–5 in) tail Habitats: Forest Diet: Vegetation
Ototylomys	Merriam, 1901 One species: O. phyllotis (Big-eared climbing rat)	Mexico and Central America	Size: 12–17 cm (5–7 in) long, plus 10–18 cm (4–7 in) tail Habitats: Forest Diet: Fruit and leaves
Tylomys (climbing rat)	Peters, 1866 Seven species: T. bullaris (Chiapan climbing rat); T. fulviventer (Fulvous-bellied climbing rat); T. mirae (Mira climbing rat); T. nudicaudus (Peters's climbing rat); T. panamensis (Panamanian climbing rat); T. tumbalensis (Tumbala climbing rat); T. watsoni (Watson's climbing rat)	Mexico, Central America, and northwestern South America	Size range: 15–29 cm (6–11 in) long, plus 15–32 cm (6–13 in) tail (Watson's climbing rat) Habitats: Forest Diets: Seeds, fruit, and other vegetation

===== Family Muridae =====
Members of the Muridae family are called murids and include gerbils and many types of mice and rats. They eat a variety of vegetation and invertebrates, though some also eat small vertebrates. Muridae comprises 801 extant species, the most of any mammal family, divided into 156 genera. These genera are divided into five subfamilies: Deomyinae, containing 55 species of spiny mice and brush-furred rats; Gerbillinae, containing 102 species of gerbils, jirds, and sand rats; Leimacomyinae, containing a single rat species; Lophiomyinae, containing a single mouse species; and Murinae, containing 642 species of Old World mice and rats. Additionally, thirteen species in Murinae have been driven extinct since 1500.

Subfamily Deomyinae – Thomas, 1888 – four genera
Name	Authority and species	Range	Size and ecology
Acomys (spiny mouse)	I. Geoffroy, 1838 22 species: A. airensis (Western Saharan spiny mouse); A. cahirinus (Cairo spiny mouse); A. chudeaui (Chudeau's spiny mouse); A. cilicicus (Asia Minor spiny mouse); A. cineraceus (Gray spiny mouse); A. dimidiatus (Eastern spiny mouse, pictured); A. ignitus (Fiery spiny mouse); A. johannis (Johan's spiny mouse); A. kempi (Kemp's spiny mouse); A. louisae (Louise's spiny mouse); A. minous (Crete spiny mouse); A. mullah (Mullah spiny mouse); A. muzei (Muze spiny mouse); A. nesiotes (Cyprus spiny mouse); A. ngurui (Nguru spiny mouse); A. percivali (Percival's spiny mouse); A. russatus (Golden spiny mouse); A. selousi (Selous's spiny mouse); A. seurati (Seurat's spiny mouse); A. spinosissimus (Southern African spiny mouse); A. subspinosus (Cape spiny mouse); A. wilsoni (Wilson's spiny mouse)	Africa, southern Europe, and southwestern Asia	Size range: 7 cm (3 in) long, plus 6 cm (2 in) tail (Cape spiny mouse) to 14 cm (6 in) long, plus 12 cm (5 in) tail (Cyprus spiny mouse) Habitats: Savanna, forest, shrubland, grassland, desert, and rocky areas Diets: Omnivorous, but primarily grain, grass, and other plant material
Deomys	Thomas, 1888 One species: D. ferrugineus (Link rat)	Central Africa	Size: 10–15 cm (4–6 in) long, plus 15–20 cm (6–8 in) tail Habitats: Inland wetlands and forest Diet: Insects and other invertebrates, as well as vegetable matter
Lophuromys (brush-furred rat)	Peters, 1874 31 species: L. angolensis (Angolan brush-furred rat); L. ansorgei (Ansorge's brush-furred rat); L. aquilus (Gray brush-furred rat); L. brevicaudus (Short-tailed brush-furred rat); L. brunneus (Thomas's Ethiopian brush-furred rat); L. chercherensis (Mount Chercher brush-furred rat); L. chrysopus (Ethiopian forest brush-furred rat); L. cinereus (Dark-colored brush-furred rat); L. dieterleni (Dieterlen's brush-furred mouse); L. dudui (Dudu's brush-furred rat); L. eisentrauti (Mount Lefo brush-furred mouse); L. flavopunctatus (Yellow-spotted brush-furred rat); L. huttereri (Hutterer's brush-furred mouse); L. kilonzoi (Kilonzo's brush furred rat); L. luteogaster (Yellow-bellied brush-furred rat); L. machangui (Machangu's brush furred rat); L. makundii (Makundi's brush-furred rat); L. medicaudatus (Medium-tailed brush-furred rat); L. melanonyx (Black-clawed brush-furred rat); L. menageshae (North Western Rift brush-furred rat); L. nudicaudus (Fire-bellied brush-furred rat); L. pseudosikapusi (Sheko Forest brush-furred rat); L. rahmi (Rahm's brush-furred rat); L. roseveari (Mount Cameroon brush-furred rat); L. sabunii (Sabuni's brush-furred rat); L. sikapusi (Rusty-bellied brush-furred rat, pictured); L. simensis (Simien brush-furred rat); L. stanleyi (Stanley's brush-furred rat); L. verhageni (Verhagen's brush-furred rat); L. woosnami (Woosnam's brush-furred rat); L. zena (Zena's brush-furred rat)	Western, central, and eastern Africa	Size range: 8 cm (3 in) long, plus 5 cm (2 in) tail (Dudu's brush-furred rat) to 18 cm (7 in) long, plus 10 cm (4 in) tail (black-clawed brush-furred rat) Habitats: Rocky areas, grassland, forest, and shrubland Diets: Insects, as well as other invertebrates, frogs, other small vertebrates, and vegetation
Uranomys	Dollman, 1909 One species: U. ruddi (Rudd's mouse)	Western, central, and eastern Africa	Size: 9–12 cm (4–5 in) long, plus 6–8 cm (2–3 in) tail Habitats: Savanna and shrubland Diet: Insects

Subfamily Gerbillinae – Gray, 1825 – fourteen genera
Name	Authority and species	Range	Size and ecology
Ammodillus	Thomas, 1904 One species: A. imbellis (Ammodile)	Ethiopia and Somalia	Size: 8–11 cm (3–4 in) long, plus 12–15 cm (5–6 in) tail Habitats: Grassland Diet: Plant material and invertebrates
Brachiones	Thomas, 1925 One species: B. przewalskii (Przewalski's gerbil)	Northern China	Size: 6–11 cm (2–4 in) long, plus 5–8 cm (2–3 in) tail Habitats: Desert Diet: Plant material and invertebrates
Desmodilliscus	Wettstein, 1916 One species: D. braueri (Pouched gerbil)	Western and northern Africa	Size: 5–8 cm (2–3 in) long, plus 3–5 cm (1–2 in) tail Habitats: Savanna Diet: Grain
Desmodillus	Thomas & Schwann, 1904 One species: D. auricularis (Cape short-eared gerbil)	Southern Africa	Size: 8–13 cm (3–5 in) long, plus 7–10 cm (3–4 in) tail Habitats: Desert Diet: Seeds, grain, and insects
Gerbilliscus (large naked-soled gerbil)	Thomas, 1897 Sixteen species: G. afra (Cape gerbil); G. boehmi (Boehm's gerbil); G. brantsii (Highveld gerbil); G. gambiana (Sahelo-Sudanian gerbil); G. guineae (Guinean gerbil); G. inclusus (Gorongoza gerbil); G. kempi (Kemp's gerbil); G. leucogaster (Bushveld gerbil, pictured); G. nigricaudus (Black-tailed gerbil); G. paeba (Hairy-footed gerbil); G. phillipsi (Phillips's gerbil); G. robustus (Fringe-tailed gerbil); G. setzeri (Namib brush-tailed gerbil); G. tytonis (Dune hairy-footed gerbil); G. validus (Savanna gerbil); G. vallinus (Bushy-tailed hairy-footed gerbil)	Sub-Saharan Africa	Size range: 8 cm (3 in) long, plus 12 cm (5 in) tail (bushveld gerbil) to 20 cm (8 in) long, plus 21 cm (8 in) tail (black-tailed gerbil) Habitats: Desert, forest, savanna, grassland, shrubland, and rocky areas Diets: Roots, bulbs, seeds, vegetation, and insects; Seeds
Gerbillus (northern pygmy gerbil)	Desmarest, 1804 49 species: G. acticola (Berbera gerbil); G. agag (Agag gerbil); G. amoenus (Pleasant gerbil); G. andersoni (Anderson's gerbil); G. aquilus (Swarthy gerbil); G. bottai (Botta's gerbil); G. brockmani (Brockman's gerbil); G. burtoni (Burton's gerbil); G. campestris (North African gerbil); G. cheesmani (Cheesman's gerbil, pictured); G. dasyurus (Wagner's gerbil); G. dunni (Dunn's gerbil); G. famulus (Black-tufted gerbil); G. floweri (Flower's gerbil); G. garamantis (Algerian gerbil); G. gerbillus (Lesser Egyptian gerbil); G. gleadowi (Indian hairy-footed gerbil); G. grobbeni (Grobben's gerbil); G. harwoodi (Harwood's gerbil); G. henleyi (Pygmy gerbil); G. hesperinus (Western gerbil); G. hoogstraali (Hoogstraal's gerbil); G. jamesi (James's gerbil); G. latastei (Lataste's gerbil); G. lowei (Lowe's gerbil); G. mackilligini (Mackilligin's gerbil); G. maghrebi (Greater short-tailed gerbil); G. mauritaniae (Mauritanian gerbil); G. mesopotamiae (Harrison's gerbil); G. muriculus (Darfur gerbil); G. nancillus (Sudan gerbil); G. nanus (Balochistan gerbil); G. nigeriae (Nigerian gerbil); G. occiduus (Occidental gerbil); G. perpallidus (Pale gerbil); G. poecilops (Large Aden gerbil); G. principulus (Principal gerbil); G. pulvinatus (Cushioned gerbil); G. pusillus (Least gerbil); G. pyramidum (Greater Egyptian gerbil); G. rosalinda (Rosalinda gerbil); G. rupicola (Rupicolous gerbil); G. simoni (Lesser short-tailed gerbil); G. somalicus (Somalian gerbil); G. stigmonyx (Khartoum gerbil); G. syrticus (Sand gerbil); G. tarabuli (Tarabul's gerbil); G. vivax (Vivacious gerbil); G. watersi (Waters's gerbil)	Northern, central, and eastern Africa and western and southern Asia	Size range: 5 cm (2 in) long, plus 8 cm (3 in) tail (least gerbil) to 22 cm (9 in) long, plus 11 cm (4 in) tail (large Aden gerbil) Habitats: Desert, savanna, forest, grassland, shrubland, coastal marine, and rocky areas Diets: Seeds, roots, nuts, grass, and insects
Meriones (jird)	Illiger, 1811 Seventeen species: M. arimalius (Arabian jird); M. chengi (Cheng's jird); M. crassus (Sundevall's jird); M. dahli (Dahl's jird); M. grandis (Moroccan jird); M. hurrianae (Indian desert jird); M. libycus (Libyan jird); M. meridianus (Midday jird); M. persicus (Persian jird); M. rex (King jird); M. sacramenti (Buxton's jird); M. shawi (Shaw's jird); M. tamariscinus (Tamarisk jird); M. tristrami (Tristram's jird); M. unguiculatus (Mongolian gerbil, pictured); M. vinogradovi (Vinogradov's jird); M. zarudnyi (Zarudny's jird)	Northern Africa and western, central, and southern Asia	Size range: 9 cm (4 in) long, plus 8 cm (3 in) tail (Mongolian gerbil) to 20 cm (8 in) long, plus 18 cm (7 in) tail (Moroccan jird) Habitats: Desert, savanna, grassland, inland wetlands, shrubland, and rocky areas Diets: Vegetation, roots, bulbs, seeds, grain, fruit, and insects
Microdillus	Thomas, 1910 One species: M. peeli (Somali pygmy gerbil)	Somalia	Size: 6–8 cm (2–3 in) long, plus 5–7 cm (2–3 in) tail Habitats: Grassland and shrubland Diet: Seeds, roots, nuts, grass, and insects
Pachyuromys	Lataste, 1880 One species: P. duprasi (Fat-tailed gerbil)	Northern Africa	Size: 9–12 cm (4–5 in) long, plus 5–7 cm (2–3 in) tail Habitats: Shrubland and desert Diet: Insects
Psammomys (sand rat)	Cretzschmar, 1828 Two species: P. obesus (Fat sand rat, pictured); P. vexillaris (Thin sand rat)	Northern Africa and Middle East	Size range: 11 cm (4 in) long, plus 8 cm (3 in) tail (thin sand rat) to 19 cm (7 in) long, plus 14 cm (6 in) tail (fat sand rat) Habitats: Inland wetlands, desert, and shrubland Diets: Succulents and other plants
Rhombomys	Wagner, 1841 One species: R. opimus (Great gerbil)	Central Asia	Size: 15–19 cm (6–7 in) long, plus 13–16 cm (5–6 in) tail Habitats: Desert, grassland, and shrubland Diet: Variety of desert plants
Sekeetamys	Ellerman, 1947 One species: S. calurus (Bushy-tailed jird)	Egypt and Middle East	Size: 9–13 cm (4–5 in) long, plus 11–17 cm (4–7 in) tail Habitats: Rocky areas and desert Diet: Plants and insects
Tatera	Lataste, 1882 One species: T. indica (Indian gerbil)	Southern and western Asia	Size: 14–21 cm (6–8 in) long, plus 15–20 cm (6–8 in) tail Habitats: Forest, desert, grassland, and shrubland Diet: Roots, bulbs, seeds, vegetation, insects, eggs, and birds
Taterillus (tateril)	Thomas, 1910 Nine species: T. arenarius (Robbins's tateril); T. congicus (Congo gerbil); T. emini (Emin's gerbil, pictured); T. gracilis (Gracile tateril); T. harringtoni (Harrington's gerbil); T. lacustris (Lake Chad gerbil); T. petteri (Petter's gerbil); T. pygargus (Senegal gerbil); T. tranieri (Tranier's tateril)	Eastern, central, and western Africa	Size range: 9 cm (4 in) long, plus 13 cm (5 in) tail (gracile tateril) to 15 cm (6 in) long, plus 19 cm (7 in) tail (Congo gerbil) Habitats: Grassland, forest, savanna, and shrubland Diets: Grain and insects

Subfamily Leimacomyinae – Musser & Carleton, 2005 – one genus
Name	Authority and species	Range	Size and ecology
Leimacomys	Matschie, 1893 One species: L. buettneri (Togo mouse)	Togo	Size: About 12 cm (5 in) long, plus about 4 cm (2 in) tail Habitats: Unknown Diet: Vegetation and insects

Subfamily Lophiomyinae – Milne-Edwards, 1867 – one genus
Name	Authority and species	Range	Size and ecology
Lophiomys	Milne-Edwards, 1867 One species: L. imhausi (Maned rat)	Eastern Africa	Size: 25–30 cm (10–12 in) long, plus 14–20 cm (6–8 in) tail Habitats: Forest, savanna, and shrubland Diet: Leaves and shoots

Subfamily Murinae – Illiger, 1811 – 136 genera
Name	Authority and species	Range	Size and ecology
Abditomys	Musser, 1982 One species: A. latidens (Luzon broad-toothed rat)	Philippines	Size: 23–27 cm (9–11 in) long, plus 22–24 cm (9 in) tail Habitats: Forest Diet: Vegetation
Abeomelomys	Menzies, 1990 One species: A. sevia (Highland brush mouse)	Papua New Guinea	Size: 11–14 cm (4–6 in) long, plus 14–20 cm (6–8 in) tail Habitats: Grassland and forest Diet: Plant material and invertebrates
Aethomys (rock rat)	Thomas, 1915 Nine species: A. bocagei (Bocage's rock rat); A. chrysophilus (Red rock rat); A. hindei (Hinde's rock rat); A. ineptus (Tete veld aethomys, pictured); A. kaiseri (Kaiser's rock rat); A. nyikae (Nyika rock rat); A. silindensis (Selinda veld rat); A. stannarius (Tinfields rock rat); A. thomasi (Thomas's rock rat)	Central, eastern, and southern Africa	Size range: 12 cm (5 in) long, plus 12 cm (5 in) tail (Hinde's rock rat) to 20 cm (8 in) long, plus 18 cm (7 in) tail (Bocage's rock rat) Habitats: Savanna, grassland, forest, rocky areas, and shrubland Diets: Grain, seeds, roots, nuts, and fruit
Anisomys	Thomas, 1904 One species: A. imitator (Squirrel-toothed rat)	New Guinea	Size: 21–28 cm (8–11 in) long, plus 27–36 cm (11–14 in) tail Habitats: Forest Diet: Nuts and other vegetation
Anonymomys	Musser, 1981 One species: A. mindorensis (Mindoro climbing rat)	Philippines	Size: 14–15 cm (6 in) long, plus 19–22 cm (7–9 in) tail Habitats: Forest Diet: Plant material and invertebrates
Apodemus (field mouse)	Kaup, 1829 20 species: A. agrarius (Striped field mouse); A. alpicola (Alpine field mouse); A. argenteus (Small Japanese field mouse, pictured); A. chevrieri (Chevrier's field mouse); A. draco (South China field mouse); A. epimelas (Western broad-toothed field mouse); A. flavicollis (Yellow-necked mouse); A. gurkha (Himalayan field mouse); A. hyrcanicus (Caucasus field mouse); A. latronum (Sichuan field mouse); A. mystacinus (Eastern broad-toothed field mouse); A. pallipes (Ward's field mouse); A. peninsulae (Korean field mouse); A. ponticus (Black Sea field mouse); A. rusiges (Kashmir field mouse); A. semotus (Taiwan field mouse); A. speciosus (Large Japanese field mouse); A. sylvaticus (Wood mouse); A. uralensis (Ural field mouse); A. witherbyi (Steppe field mouse)	Europe, Asia, and northern Africa	Size range: 6 cm (2 in) long, plus 7 cm (3 in) tail (small Japanese field mouse) to 15 cm (6 in) long, plus 15 cm (6 in) tail (western broad-toothed field mouse) Habitats: Coastal marine, grassland, inland wetlands, forest, rocky areas, and shrubland Diets: Roots, grain, seeds, berries, nuts, and insects
Apomys (earthworm mouse)	Mearns, 1905 Nineteen species: A. abrae (Luzon Cordillera forest mouse); A. aurorae (Luzon Aurora forest mouse); A. banahao (Mount Banahaw forest mouse); A. brownorum (Mount Tapulao forest mouse); A. camiguinensis (Camiguin forest mouse); A. datae (Luzon montane forest mouse); A. gracilirostris (Large Mindoro forest mouse); A. hylocetes (Mount Apo forest mouse); A. insignis (Mindanao montane forest mouse); A. iridensis (Mount Irid forest mouse); A. littoralis (Mindanao lowland forest mouse); A. lubangensis (Lubang forest mouse); A. magnus (Luzon giant forest mouse); A. microdon (Small Luzon forest mouse); A. minganensis (Mount Mingan forest mouse); A. musculus (Least forest mouse); A. sacobianus (Long-nosed Luzon forest mouse, pictured); A. sierrae (Sierra Madre forest mouse); A. zambalensis (Luzon Zambales forest mouse)	Philippines	Size range: 7 cm (3 in) long, plus 9 cm (4 in) tail (least forest mouse) to 18 cm (7 in) long, plus 16 cm (6 in) tail (Sierra Madre forest mouse) Habitats: Forest, shrubland, and grassland Diets: Omnivorous
Archboldomys (shrew-mouse)	Musser, 1982 Two species: A. luzonensis (Mount Isarog shrew-mouse); A. maximus (Large Cordillera shrew-mouse)	Philippines	Size range: 10–12 cm (4–5 in) long, plus 9–11 cm (4 in) tail (large Cordillera shrew-mouse) Habitats: Forest Diets: Worms and soft-bodied invertebrates
Arvicanthis (unstriped grass rat)	Lesson, 1842 Seven species: A. abyssinicus (Abyssinian grass rat); A. ansorgei (Sudanian grass rat); A. blicki (Blick's grass rat); A. nairobae (Nairobi grass rat); A. neumanni (Neumann's grass rat); A. niloticus (African grass rat, pictured); A. rufinus (Guinean grass rat)	Africa	Size range: 11 cm (4 in) long, plus 12 cm (5 in) tail (Guinean grass rat) to 19 cm (7 in) long, plus 16 cm (6 in) tail (African grass rat) Habitats: Savanna, shrubland, and grassland Diets: Seeds, leaves, grass, and grain
Baiyankamys (mountain water rat)	Hinton, 1943 Two species: B. habbema (Mountain water rat); B. shawmayeri (Shaw Mayer's water rat)	New Guinea	Size range: 13–16 cm (5–6 in) long, plus 15–19 cm (6–7 in) tail (mountain water rat) Habitats: Forest, inland wetlands, grassland, and shrubland Diets: Fish and aquatic insects, as well as spiders, crustaceans, mussels, frogs, turtles, birds, and bats
Bandicota (bandicoot rat)	Gray, 1873 Three species: B. bengalensis (Lesser bandicoot rat); B. indica (Greater bandicoot rat); B. savilei (Savile's bandicoot rat)	Southern and southeastern Asia	Size range: 14 cm (6 in) long, plus 7 cm (3 in) tail (Savile's bandicoot rat) to 35 cm (14 in) long, plus 28 cm (11 in) tail (greater bandicoot rat) Habitats: Forest, inland wetlands, shrubland, and grassland Diets: Omnivorous
Batomys (hairy-tailed rat)	Thomas, 1895 Six species: B. dentatus (Large-toothed hairy-tailed rat); B. granti (Luzon Cordillera hairy-tailed rat); B. hamiguitan (Hamiguitan hairy-tailed rat); B. russatus (Dinagat hairy-tailed rat); B. salomonseni (Mindanao hairy-tailed rat); B. uragon (Mount Isarog hairy-tailed rat)	Philippines	Size range: 13 cm (5 in) long, plus 13 cm (5 in) tail (Mindanao hairy-tailed rat) to 21 cm (8 in) long, plus 18 cm (7 in) tail (Mount Isarog hairy-tailed rat) Habitats: Forest Diets: Leaves, seeds, and fruit
Berylmys (white-toothed rat)	Ellerman, 1947 Five species: B. berdmorei (Small white-toothed rat); B. bowersi (Bower's white-toothed rat, pictured); B. latouchei (West Chinese white-toothed rat); B. mackenziei (Kenneth's white-toothed rat); B. manipulus (Manipur white-toothed rat)	Southeastern Asia and eastern China	Size range: 13 cm (5 in) long, plus 14 cm (6 in) tail (Manipur white-toothed rat) to 30 cm (12 in) long, plus 31 cm (12 in) tail (Bower's white-toothed rat) Habitats: Forest, grassland, and shrubland Diets: Leaves, grass, seeds, fruit, insects, molluscs, and worms
Brassomys	Musser & Lunde, 2009 One species: B. albidens (White-toothed brush mouse)	Western New Guinea	Size: 11–13 cm (4–5 in) long, plus 14–17 cm (6–7 in) tail Habitats: Grassland and shrubland Diet: Leaves and other vegetation
Bullimus (large forest rat)	Mearns, 1905 Three species: B. bagobus (Bagobo rat, pictured); B. gamay (Camiguin forest rat); B. luzonicus (Large Luzon forest rat)	Philippines	Size range: 22 cm (9 in) long, plus 14 cm (6 in) tail (Camiguin forest rat) to 27 cm (11 in) long, plus 20 cm (8 in) tail (Bagobo rat) Habitats: Forest and shrubland Diets: Plant material and invertebrates
Bunomys (hill rat)	Thomas, 1910 Seven species: B. andrewsi (Andrew's hill rat); B. chrysocomus (Yellow-haired hill rat, pictured); B. coelestis (Heavenly hill rat); B. karokophilus (Karoko hill rat); B. penitus (Inland hill rat); B. prolatus (Long-headed hill rat); B. torajae (Tana Toraja hill rat)	Indonesia	Size range: 9 cm (4 in) long, plus 9 cm (4 in) tail (yellow-haired hill rat) to 24 cm (9 in) long, plus 19 cm (7 in) tail (inland hill rat) Habitats: Forest and shrubland Diets: Fruit, insects, snails, and worms
Carpomys (Luzon tree rat)	Thomas, 1895 Two species: C. melanurus (Short-footed Luzon tree rat); C. phaeurus (White-bellied Luzon tree rat, pictured)	Philippines	Size range: 16 cm (6 in) long, plus 15 cm (6 in) tail (white-bellied Luzon tree rat) to 19 cm (7 in) long, plus 19 cm (7 in) tail (short-footed Luzon tree rat) Habitats: Forest Diets: Plant material and invertebrates
Chiromyscus	Thomas, 1925 One species: C. chiropus (Fea's tree rat)	Southeastern Asia	Size: 13–16 cm (5–6 in) long, plus 20–23 cm (8–9 in) tail Habitats: Shrubland and forest Diet: Plant material and invertebrates
Chiropodomys (pencil-tailed tree mouse)	Peters, 1869 Six species: C. calamianensis (Palawan pencil-tailed tree mouse); C. gliroides (Indomalayan pencil-tailed tree mouse); C. karlkoopmani (Koopman's pencil-tailed tree mouse); C. major (Large pencil-tailed tree mouse); C. muroides (Gray-bellied pencil-tailed tree mouse); C. pusillus (Small pencil-tailed tree mouse)	Southeastern Asia	Size range: 6 cm (2 in) long, plus 8 cm (3 in) tail (gray-bellied pencil-tailed tree mouse) to 13 cm (5 in) long, plus 18 cm (7 in) tail (Palawan pencil-tailed tree mouse) Habitats: Forest Diets: Vegetation
Chiruromys (tree mouse)	Thomas, 1888 Three species: C. forbesi (Greater tree mouse); C. lamia (Broad-headed tree mouse); C. vates (Lesser tree mouse)	Papua New Guinea	Size range: 8 cm (3 in) long, plus 12 cm (5 in) tail (lesser tree mouse) to 17 cm (7 in) long, plus 23 cm (9 in) tail (greater tree mouse) Habitats: Forest Diets: Leaves and grass and bamboo shoots
Chrotomys (striped shrew-rat)	Thomas, 1895 Five species: C. gonzalesi (Isarog striped shrew-rat); C. mindorensis (Mindoro striped rat, pictured); C. sibuyanensis (Sibuyan striped shrew-rat); C. silaceus (Blazed Luzon shrew-rat); C. whiteheadi (Luzon striped rat)	Philippines	Size range: 13 cm (5 in) long, plus 9 cm (4 in) tail (blazed Luzon shrew-rat) to 19 cm (7 in) long, plus 11 cm (4 in) tail (Isarog striped shrew-rat) Habitats: Forest Diets: Sweet potatoes, grass, and worms
Coccymys (brush mouse)	Menzies, 1990 Three species: C. kirrhos (Tawny brush mouse); C. ruemmleri (Rümmler's brush mouse); C. shawmayeri (Central Cordillera brush mouse)	Papua New Guinea and New Guinea	Size range: 8 cm (3 in) long, plus 13 cm (5 in) tail (Central Cordillera brush mouse) to 12 cm (5 in) long, plus 18 cm (7 in) tail (Rümmler's brush mouse) Habitats: Forest and grassland Diets: Leaves and other vegetation
Colomys	Thomas & Wroughton, 1907 One species: C. goslingi (African wading rat)	Central Africa	Size: 10–16 cm (4–6 in) long, plus 14–19 cm (6–7 in) tail Habitats: Savanna, forest, grassland, and inland wetlands Diet: Worms, slugs, crustaceans, and aquatic insects, as well as small vertebrates and some vegetation
Conilurus (rabbit rat)	Ogilby, 1838 Three species: C. albipes (White-footed rabbit rat); C. capricornensis † (Capricorn rabbit rat); C. penicillatus † (Brush-tailed rabbit rat)	Southeastern Australia, Northern Australia and Papua New Guinea, and Northeastern Australia	Size range: 15–20 cm (6–8 in) long, plus 17–21 cm (7–8 in) tail (brush-tailed rabbit rat) Habitats: Savanna and forest Diets: Plant material and invertebrates
Crateromys (bushy-tailed cloud rat)	Thomas, 1895 Four species: C. australis (Dinagat bushy-tailed cloud rat); C. heaneyi (Panay cloudrunner, pictured); C. paulus (Ilin Island cloudrunner); C. schadenbergi (Giant bushy-tailed cloud rat)	Philippines	Size range: 25 cm (10 in) long, plus 21 cm (8 in) tail (Ilin Island cloudrunner) to 37 cm (15 in) long, plus 39 cm (15 in) tail (giant bushy-tailed cloud rat) Habitats: Forest Diets: Fruit and pine tree sprouts, buds, and bark
Cremnomys (Cutch rat)	Wroughton, 1912 Two species: C. cutchicus (Cutch rat, pictured); C. elvira (Elvira rat)	India and Southern India	Size range: 10 cm (4 in) long, plus 12 cm (5 in) tail (Cutch rat) to 15 cm (6 in) long, plus 20 cm (8 in) tail (Elvira rat) Habitats: Grassland, desert, forest, rocky areas, and shrubland Diets: Plant material and invertebrates
Crossomys	Thomas, 1907 One species: C. moncktoni (Earless water rat)	New Guinea	Size: 17–23 cm (7–9 in) long, plus 21–27 cm (8–11 in) tail Habitats: Forest and inland wetlands Diet: Tadpoles, insects, mollusks, and small aquatic vertebrates
Crunomys (shrew-rat)	Thomas, 1897 Four species: C. celebensis (Celebes shrew-rat); C. fallax (Northern Luzon shrew-rat, pictured); C. melanius (Mindanao shrew-rat); C. suncoides (Katanglad shrew-mouse)	Philippines and Indonesia	Size range: 9–14 cm (4–6 in) long, plus 6–10 cm (2–4 in) tail (Mindanao shrew-rat) Habitats: Forest Diets: Plant material and invertebrates
Dacnomys	Thomas, 1916 One species: D. millardi (Millard's rat)	Southeastern Asia	Size: 21–27 cm (8–11 in) long, plus 29–33 cm (11–13 in) tail Habitats: Forest Diet: Plant material and invertebrates
Dasymys (marsh rat)	Peters, 1875 Nine species: D. alleni (Glover Allen's dasymys); D. cabrali (Crawford-Cabral's shaggy rat); D. foxi (Fox's shaggy rat); D. incomtus (African marsh rat); D. montanus (Montane shaggy rat); D. nudipes (Angolan marsh rat); D. rufulus (West African shaggy rat); D. rwandae (Rwandan shaggy rat); D. sua (Tanzanian shaggy rat)	Sub-Saharan Africa	Size range: 11 cm (4 in) long, plus 10 cm (4 in) tail (Glover Allen's dasymys) to 20 cm (8 in) long, plus 16 cm (6 in) tail (African marsh rat) Habitats: Savanna, grassland, inland wetlands, forest, and shrubland Diets: Aquatic plants, as well as insects
Dephomys (Ivory Coast rat)	Thomas, 1926 Two species: D. defua (Defua rat); D. eburneae (Ivory Coast rat)	Western Africa	Size range: 11 cm (4 in) long, plus 18 cm (7 in) tail (Defua rat) to 15 cm (6 in) long, plus 20 cm (8 in) tail (Ivory Coast rat) Habitats: Forest Diets: Fruit and insects
Desmomys (scrub rat)	Thomas, 1910 Two species: D. harringtoni (Harrington's rat); D. yaldeni (Yalden's rat)	Ethiopia	Size range: 11 cm (4 in) long, plus 14 cm (6 in) tail (Yalden's rat) to 15 cm (6 in) long, plus 14 cm (6 in) tail (Harrington's rat) Habitats: Forest and shrubland Diets: Plant material and invertebrates
Diomys	Thomas, 1917 One species: D. crumpi (Crump's mouse)	Scattered southern Asia	Size: 10–14 cm (4–6 in) long, plus 10–13 cm (4–5 in) tail Habitats: Forest Diet: Plant material and invertebrates
Diplothrix	Thomas, 1916 One species: D. legata (Ryukyu long-tailed giant rat)	Southern islands of Japan	Size: About 23 cm (9 in) Habitats: Forest Diet: Plant material and invertebrates
Echiothrix (echiothrix)	Gray, 1867 Two species: E. centrosa (Central Sulawesi echiothrix, pictured); E. leucura (Northern Sulawesi echiothrix)	Indonesia	Size range: 18 cm (7 in) long, plus 23 cm (9 in) tail (central Sulawesi echiothrix) to 23 cm (9 in) long, plus 27 cm (11 in) tail (northern Sulawesi echiothrix) Habitats: Forest Diets: Worms
Eropeplus	Miller & Hollister, 1921 One species: E. canus (Sulawesi soft-furred rat)	Indonesia	Size: 23–25 cm (9–10 in) long, plus 27–30 cm (11–12 in) tail Habitats: Forest Diet: Plant material and invertebrates
Frateromys	Sody, 1941 One species: F. fratrorum (Northeastern peninsula hill rat)	Indonesia	Size: 15–19 cm (6–7 in) long, plus 15–20 cm (6–8 in) tail Habitats: Forest Diet: Plant material and invertebrates
Golunda	Gray, 1837 One species: G. ellioti (Indian bush rat)	Southern Asia	Size: 9–17 cm (4–7 in) long, plus 7–14 cm (3–6 in) tail Habitats: Shrubland, forest, and grassland Diet: Roots and grass, as well as other vegetation
Gracilimus	Rowe, Achmadi, & Esselstyn, 2016 One species: G. radix (Sulawesi root rat)	Indonesia	Size: 10–13 cm (4–5 in) long, plus 16–17 cm (6–7 in) tail Habitats: Forest Diet: Plant material and invertebrates
Grammomys (thicket rat)	Thomas, 1915 Eleven species: G. aridulus (Arid thicket rat); G. buntingi (Bunting's thicket rat); G. caniceps (Gray-headed thicket rat); G. cometes (Mozambique thicket rat); G. dolichurus (Woodland thicket rat, pictured); G. dryas (Forest thicket rat); G. gigas (Giant thicket rat); G. ibeanus (Ruwenzori thicket rat); G. kuru (Eastern rainforest grammomys); G. macmillani (Macmillan's thicket rat); G. minnae (Ethiopian thicket rat)	Sub-Saharan Africa	Size range: 8 cm (3 in) long, plus 14 cm (6 in) tail (gray-headed thicket rat) to 15 cm (6 in) long, plus 18 cm (7 in) tail (eastern rainforest grammomys) Habitats: Savanna, grassland, inland wetlands, forest, and shrubland Diets: Stems, fruit, nuts, flowers, and other vegetation, as well as insects
Hadromys (bush rat)	Thomas, 1911 Two species: H. humei (Manipur bush rat, pictured); H. yunnanensis (Yunnan bush rat)	Eastern India and Southern China	Size range: 9–14 cm (4–6 in) long, plus 11–14 cm (4–6 in) tail (multiple) Habitats: Forest Diets: Grass
Haeromys (ranee mouse)	Thomas, 1911 Three species: H. margarettae (Ranee mouse); H. minahassae (Minahassa ranee mouse); H. pusillus (Lesser ranee mouse)	Southeastern Asia	Size range: 7 cm (3 in) long, plus 12 cm (5 in) tail (lesser ranee mouse) to 8 cm (3 in) long, plus 14 cm (6 in) tail (Minahassa ranee mouse) Habitats: Forest Diets: Seeds
Halmaheramys (Halmahera spiny rat)	Fabre, Pagès, Musser, Fitriana, Semiadi, & Helgen, 2013 Two species: H. bokimekot (Spiny Boki Mekot rat); H. wallacei (Wallace's large spiny rat)	Indonesia	Size range: 14 cm (6 in) long, plus 11 cm (4 in) tail (spiny Boki Mekot rat) to 24 cm (9 in) long, plus 21 cm (8 in) tail (Wallace's large spiny rat) Habitats: Forest Diets: Plant material and invertebrates
Hapalomys (marmoset rat)	Blyth, 1859 Three species: H. delacouri (Delacour's marmoset rat, pictured); H. longicaudatus (Marmoset rat); H. suntsovi (Suntsov's marmoset rat)	Southeastern Asia	Size range: 10 cm (4 in) long, plus 13 cm (5 in) tail (Delacour's marmoset rat) to 17 cm (7 in) long, plus 20 cm (8 in) tail (marmoset rat) Habitats: Forest Diets: Bamboo shoots, flowers, and fruit
Heimyscus	Misonne, 1969 One species: H. fumosus (African smoky mouse)	West-central Africa	Size: 8–10 cm (3–4 in) long, plus 8–12 cm (3–5 in) tail Habitats: Forest Diet: Plant material and invertebrates
Hybomys (striped mouse)	Thomas, 1910 Six species: H. badius (Eisentraut's striped mouse); H. basilii (Father Basilio's striped mouse); H. lunaris (Moon striped mouse); H. planifrons (Miller's striped mouse); H. trivirgatus (Temminck's striped mouse); H. univittatus (Peters's striped mouse)	Western Uganda and eastern Democratic Republic of the Congo, Central Africa, Western Africa, and Cameroon	Size range: 10 cm (4 in) long, plus 10 cm (4 in) tail (Eisentraut's striped mouse) to 16 cm (6 in) long, plus 14 cm (6 in) tail (Father Basilio's striped mouse) Habitats: Forest Diets: Fruit, roots, and insects
Hydromys (water rat)	Geoffroy, 1804 Four species: H. chrysogaster (Rakali, pictured); H. hussoni (Western water rat); H. neobritannicus (New Britain water rat); H. ziegleri (Ziegler's water rat)	Australia and southeastern Asia	Size range: 12 cm (5 in) long, plus 10 cm (4 in) tail (western water rat) to 39 cm (15 in) long, plus 32 cm (13 in) tail (rakali) Habitats: Coastal marine, forest, inland wetlands, and neritic marine Diets: Fish and aquatic insects, as well as spiders, crustaceans, mussels, frogs, turtles, birds, and bats
Hylomyscus (wood mouse)	Thomas, 1926 Sixteen species: H. aeta (Beaded wood mouse); H. alleni (Allen's wood mouse); H. anselli (Ansell's wood mouse); H. arcimontensis (Arc Mountain wood mouse); H. baeri (Baer's wood mouse); H. carillus (Angolan wood mouse); H. denniae (Montane wood mouse); H. endorobae (Mount Kenya wood mouse); H. grandis (Mount Oku hylomyscus); H. heinrichorum (Heinrich's wood mouse); H. kerbispeterhansi (Kerbis Peterhans's wood mouse); H. pamfi (Dahomey Gap wood mouse); H. parvus (Little wood mouse); H. stella (Stella wood mouse); H. vulcanorum (Albertine Rift wood mouse); H. walterverheyeni (Walter Verheyen's mouse)	Eastern, central, and western Africa	Size range: 5 cm (2 in) long, plus 5 cm (2 in) tail (Dahomey Gap wood mouse) to 12 cm (5 in) long, plus 15 cm (6 in) tail (Baer's wood mouse) Habitats: Forest Diets: Fruit and other vegetation, as well as animals
Hyomys (white-eared giant rat)	Thomas, 1904 Two species: H. dammermani (Western white-eared giant rat); H. goliath (Eastern white-eared giant rat)	New Guinea	Size range: 29 cm (11 in) long, plus 24 cm (9 in) tail (western white-eared giant rat) to 39 cm (15 in) long, plus 38 cm (15 in) tail (eastern white-eared giant rat) Habitats: Forest Diets: Shoots as well as other vegetation
Hyorhinomys	Esselstyn, Achmadi, Handika, & Rowe, 2015 One species: H. stuempkei (Hog-nosed shrew rat)	Indonesia	Size: 11–13 cm (4–5 in) long, plus 8–10 cm (3–4 in) tail Habitats: Forest Diet: Plant material and invertebrates
Kadarsanomys	Musser, 1981 One species: K. sodyi (Sody's tree rat)	Indonesia	Size: 16–21 cm (6–8 in) long, plus 25–30 cm (10–12 in) tail Habitats: Forest Diet: Plant material and invertebrates
Komodomys	Musser & Boeadi, 1980 One species: K. rintjanus (Komodo rat)	Indonesia	Size: 12–18 cm (5–7 in) long, plus 12–17 cm (5–7 in) tail Habitats: Shrubland and forest Diet: Plant material and invertebrates
Lamottemys	Petter, 1986 One species: L. okuensis (Mount Oku rat)	Cameroon	Size: 13–15 cm (5–6 in) long, plus 12–14 cm (5–6 in) tail Habitats: Forest Diet: Plant material and invertebrates
Leggadina (short-tailed mouse)	Thomas, 1910 Two species: L. forresti (Forrest's mouse); L. lakedownensis (Lakeland Downs mouse, pictured)	Northern and central Australia	Size range: 5 cm (2 in) long, plus 4 cm (2 in) tail (Lakeland Downs mouse) to 10 cm (4 in) long, plus 7 cm (3 in) tail (Forrest's mouse) Habitats: Desert, savanna, grassland, and shrubland Diets: Seeds and vegetation
Lemniscomys (striped grass mouse)	Trouessart, 1881 Eleven species: L. barbarus (Barbary striped grass mouse, pictured); L. bellieri (Bellier's striped grass mouse); L. griselda (Griselda's striped grass mouse); L. hoogstraali (Hoogstraal's striped grass mouse); L. linulus (Senegal one-striped grass mouse); L. macculus (Buffoon striped grass mouse); L. mittendorfi (Mittendorf's striped grass mouse); L. rosalia (Single-striped grass mouse); L. roseveari (Rosevear's striped grass mouse); L. striatus (Typical striped grass mouse); L. zebra (Heuglin's striped grass mouse)	Sub-Saharan Africa	Size range: 8 cm (3 in) long, plus 7 cm (3 in) tail (buffoon striped grass mouse) to 17 cm (7 in) long, plus 16 cm (6 in) tail (single-striped grass mouse) Habitats: Savanna, forest, grassland, and shrubland Diets: Grass, seeds, grains, and insects
Lenomys	Thomas, 1898 One species: L. meyeri (Trefoil-toothed giant rat)	Indonesia	Size: 23–30 cm (9–12 in) long, plus 24–30 cm (9–12 in) tail Habitats: Forest Diet: Plant material and invertebrates
Lenothrix	Miller, 1903 One species: L. canus (Gray tree rat)	Malaysia and Brunei	Size: 14–21 cm (6–8 in) long, plus 19–29 cm (7–11 in) tail Habitats: Forest Diet: Plant material and invertebrates
Leopoldamys (long-tailed giant rat)	Ellerman, 1947 Seven species: L. ciliatus (Sundaic mountain leopoldamys); L. diwangkarai (Diwangkara's long-tailed giant rat); L. edwardsi (Edwards's long-tailed giant rat); L. milleti (Millet's leopoldamys); L. neilli (Neill's long-tailed giant rat); L. sabanus (Long-tailed giant rat, pictured); L. siporanus (Mentawai long-tailed giant rat)	Southeastern Asia	Size range: 17 cm (7 in) long, plus 22 cm (9 in) tail (Mentawai long-tailed giant rat) to 29 cm (11 in) long, plus 31 cm (12 in) tail (Edwards's long-tailed giant rat) Habitats: Forest Diets: Insects, other invertebrates, and a wide variety of vegetation
Leporillus (stick-nest rat)	Thomas, 1906 Two species: L. apicalis † (Lesser stick-nest rat); L. conditor (Greater stick-nest rat, pictured)	Southern and western Australia	Size range: 17–26 cm (7–10 in) long, plus 14–18 cm (6–7 in) tail (greater stick-nest rat) Habitats: Savanna, grassland, desert, caves, rocky areas, and shrubland Diets: Succulents and other vegetation
Leptomys (narrow water rat)	Thomas, 1897 Five species: L. arfakensis (Arfak water rat); L. elegans (Long-footed water rat); L. ernstmayri (Ernst Mayr's water rat); L. paulus (Small water rat); L. signatus (Fly River water rat)	New Guinea	Size range: 11 cm (4 in) long, plus 13 cm (5 in) tail (small water rat) to 20 cm (8 in) long, plus 17 cm (7 in) tail (long-footed water rat) Habitats: Forest Diets: Insects and small animals
Limnomys (mountain rat)	Mearns, 1905 Two species: L. bryophilus (Gray-bellied mountain rat); L. sibuanus (Mindanao mountain rat, pictured)	Philippines	Size range: 11–15 cm (4–6 in) long, plus 14–19 cm (6–7 in) tail (multiple) Habitats: Forest Diets: Plant material and invertebrates
Lorentzimys	Jentink, 1911 One species: L. nouhuysi (New Guinean jumping mouse)	New Guinea	Size: 5–9 cm (2–4 in) long, plus 11–13 cm (4–5 in) tail Habitats: Forest Diet: Insects, vegetation, and fungi
Macruromys (small-toothed rat)	Stein, 1933 Two species: M. elegans (Lesser small-toothed rat); M. major (Eastern small-toothed rat)	Western New Guinea and New Guinea	Size range: 15 cm (6 in) long, plus 21 cm (8 in) tail (lesser small-toothed rat) to 26 cm (10 in) long, plus 34 cm (13 in) tail (eastern small-toothed rat) Habitats: Forest Diets: Vegetation
Madromys	Sody, 1941 One species: M. blanfordi (Blanford's rat)	Southern Asia	Size: 15–19 cm (6–7 in) long, plus 18–21 cm (7–8 in) tail Habitats: Caves, forest, and shrubland Diet: Plant material and invertebrates
Malacomys (swamp rat)	A. Milne-Edwards, 1877 Three species: M. cansdalei (Cansdale's swamp rat); M. edwardsi (Edward's swamp rat); M. longipes (Big-eared swamp rat, pictured)	Central and western Africa	Size range: 12 cm (5 in) long, plus 15 cm (6 in) tail (Edward's swamp rat) to 18 cm (7 in) long, plus 20 cm (8 in) tail (big-eared swamp rat) Habitats: Forest, inland wetlands, and shrubland Diets: Fruit, seeds, nuts, roots, insects, slugs, snails, and crabs
Mallomys (woolly rat)	Thomas, 1898 Four species: M. aroaensis (De Vis's woolly rat); M. gunung (Alpine woolly rat, pictured); M. istapantap (Subalpine woolly rat); M. rothschildi (Rothschild's woolly rat)	New Guinea	Size range: 34 cm (13 in) long, plus 33 cm (13 in) tail (De Vis's woolly rat) to 47 cm (19 in) long, plus 37 cm (15 in) tail (alpine woolly rat) Habitats: Grassland, forest, caves, rocky areas, and shrubland Diets: Shoots as well as other vegetation
Mammelomys (large mosaic-tailed rat)	Menzies, 1996 Two species: M. lanosus (Large-scaled mosaic-tailed rat); M. rattoides (Large mosaic-tailed rat)	New Guinea	Size range: 13 cm (5 in) long, plus 10 cm (4 in) tail (large-scaled mosaic-tailed rat) to 22 cm (9 in) long, plus 15 cm (6 in) tail (large mosaic-tailed rat) Habitats: Forest Diets: Plant material and invertebrates
Margaretamys (margareta rat)	Musser, 1981 Four species: M. beccarii (Beccari's margareta rat, pictured); M. christinae (Christine's margareta rat); M. elegans (Elegant margareta rat); M. parvus (Little margareta rat)	Indonesia	Size range: 9 cm (4 in) long, plus 15 cm (6 in) tail (little margareta rat) to 20 cm (8 in) long, plus 29 cm (11 in) tail (elegant margareta rat) Habitats: Forest Diets: Plant material and invertebrates
Mastacomys	Thomas, 1882 One species: M. fuscus (Broad-toothed mouse)	Southeastern Australia	Size: 14–20 cm (6–8 in) long, plus 10–14 cm (4–6 in) tail Habitats: Forest, shrubland, grassland, and inland wetlands Diet: Plant material and invertebrates
Mastomys (multimammate mouse)	Thomas, 1915 Eight species: M. awashensis (Awash multimammate mouse); M. coucha (Southern multimammate mouse, pictured); M. erythroleucus (Guinea multimammate mouse); M. huberti (Hubert's multimammate mouse); M. kollmannspergeri (Verheyen's multimammate mouse); M. natalensis (Natal multimammate mouse); M. pernanus (Dwarf multimammate mouse); M. shortridgei (Shortridge's multimammate mouse)	Morocco and Sub-Saharan Africa	Size range: 7 cm (3 in) long, plus 6 cm (2 in) tail (dwarf multimammate mouse) to 18 cm (7 in) long, plus 16 cm (6 in) tail (Guinea multimammate mouse) Habitats: Savanna, grassland, inland wetlands, forest, and shrubland Diets: Grass, seeds, and insects
Maxomys (spiny rat)	Sody, 1936 Eighteen species: M. alticola (Mountain spiny rat); M. baeodon (Small Bornean maxomys); M. bartelsii (Bartels's spiny rat); M. dollmani (Dollman's spiny rat); M. hellwaldii (Hellwald's spiny rat); M. hylomyoides (Sumatran spiny rat); M. inas (Malayan mountain spiny rat); M. inflatus (Fat-nosed spiny rat); M. moi (Mo's spiny rat); M. musschenbroekii (Musschenbroek's spiny rat); M. ochraceiventer (Chestnut-bellied spiny rat); M. pagensis (Pagai spiny rat); M. panglima (Palawan spiny rat); M. rajah (Rajah spiny rat); M. surifer (Red spiny rat); M. tajuddinii (Tajuddin's spiny rat); M. wattsi (Watts's spiny rat); M. whiteheadi (Whitehead's spiny rat, pictured)	Southeastern Asia	Size range: 9 cm (4 in) long, plus 10 cm (4 in) tail (Tajuddin's spiny rat) to 23 cm (9 in) long, plus 21 cm (8 in) tail (rajah spiny rat) Habitats: Forest and shrubland Diets: Roots, fruit, and other vegetation, as well as invertebrates and small vertebrates
Melasmothrix	Miller & Hollister, 1921 One species: M. naso (Sulawesian shrew rat)	Indonesia	Size: 11–13 cm (4–5 in) long, plus 8–10 cm (3–4 in) tail Habitats: Forest Diet: Worms and insect larvae
Melomys (mosaic-tailed rat)	Thomas, 1922 22 species: M. aerosus (Dusky mosaic-tailed rat); M. arcium (Rossel Island melomys); M. bannisteri (Bannister's rat); M. bougainville (Bougainville mosaic-tailed rat); M. burtoni (Grassland mosaic-tailed rat); M. capensis (Cape York melomys); M. caurinus (Short-tailed Talaud mosaic-tailed rat); M. cervinipes (Fawn-footed mosaic-tailed rat); M. cooperae (Yamdena mosaic-tailed rat); M. dollmani (Dollman's melomys); M. fraterculus (Manusela mosaic-tailed rat); M. frigicola (Snow Mountains grassland mosaic-tailed rat); M. fulgens (Seram long-tailed mosaic-tailed rat); M. howi (Riama mosaic-tailed rat); M. leucogaster (White-bellied mosaic-tailed rat); M. lutillus (Papua grassland mosaic-tailed rat); M. matambuai (Manus Island mosaic-tailed rat); M. obiensis (Obi mosaic-tailed rat); M. paveli (Pavel's Seram mosaic-tailed rat); M. rubicola † (Bramble Cay melomys); M. rufescens (Black-tailed mosaic-tailed rat); M. talaudium (Long-tailed Talaud mosaic-tailed rat)	Southeastern Asia and Australia	Size range: 9–20 cm (4–8 in) long, plus 10–18 cm (4–7 in) tail (fawn-footed mosaic-tailed rat) Habitats: Savanna, grassland, forest, inland wetlands, and shrubland Diets: Fruit, berries, and other vegetation
Mesembriomys (tree-rat)	Palmer, 1906 Two species: M. gouldii (Black-footed tree-rat); M. macrurus (Golden-backed tree-rat, pictured)	Northern Australia	Size range: 18 cm (7 in) long, plus 29 cm (11 in) tail (golden-backed tree-rat) to 30 cm (12 in) long, plus 41 cm (16 in) tail (black-footed tree-rat) Habitats: Savanna and forest Diets: Seeds, nuts, and insects
Micaelamys (rock mouse)	Ellerman, 1941 Two species: M. granti (Grant's rock mouse); M. namaquensis (Namaqua rock rat, pictured)	Southern Africa	Size range: 8–15 cm (3–6 in) long, plus 10–20 cm (4–8 in) tail (Namaqua rock rat) Habitats: Savanna, grassland, desert, forest, rocky areas, and shrubland Diets: Grain, seeds, roots, nuts, and fruit
Microhydromys (groove-toothed shrew mouse)	Tate & Archbold, 1941 Two species: M. argenteus (Southern groove-toothed moss mouse); M. richardsoni (Northern groove-toothed shrew mouse)	New Guinea	Size range: 7–9 cm (3–4 in) long, plus 8–10 cm (3–4 in) tail (northern groove-toothed shrew mouse) Habitats: Savanna and forest Diets: Insects
Micromys	Dehne, 1841 One species: M. minutus (Eurasian harvest mouse)	Europe and Asia	Size: 4–8 cm (2–3 in) long, plus 3–8 cm (1–3 in) tail Habitats: Forest and inland wetlands Diet: Seeds, vegetation, and insects, as well as bird eggs
Millardia (soft-furred rat)	Thomas, 1911 Four species: M. gleadowi (Sand-colored soft-furred rat, pictured); M. kathleenae (Miss Ryley's soft-furred rat); M. kondana (Kondana rat); M. meltada (Soft-furred rat)	Southern Asia	Size range: 7 cm (3 in) long, plus 6 cm (2 in) tail (sand-colored soft-furred rat) to 20 cm (8 in) long, plus 19 cm (7 in) tail (Kondana rat) Habitats: Grassland, desert, forest, rocky areas, and shrubland Diets: Grain, seeds, and swamp vegetation
Mirzamys (moss rat)	Helgen & Helgen, 2009 Two species: M. louiseae (Mirza's western moss rat); M. norahae (Mirza's eastern moss rat)	New Guinea	Size range: 9 cm (4 in) long, plus 10 cm (4 in) tail (Mirza's western moss rat) to 12 cm (5 in) long, plus 10 cm (4 in) tail (Mirza's eastern moss rat) Habitats: Forest and grassland Diets: Plant material and invertebrates
Muriculus	Rüppell, 1842 One species: M. imberbis (Ethiopian striped mouse)	Ethiopia	Size: 7–8 cm (3 in) long, plus 4–6 cm (2 in) tail Habitats: Grassland Diet: Plant material and invertebrates
Mus (mouse)	Linnaeus, 1758 39 species: M. baoulei (Baoule's mouse); M. booduga (Little Indian field mouse); M. bufo (Toad mouse); M. callewaerti (Callewaert's mouse); M. caroli (Ryukyu mouse); M. cervicolor (Fawn-colored mouse); M. cookii (Cook's mouse); M. crociduroides (Sumatran shrewlike mouse); M. cypriacus (Cypriot mouse); M. famulus (Servant mouse); M. fernandoni (Ceylon spiny mouse); M. fragilicauda (Sheath-tailed mouse); M. goundae (Gounda mouse); M. harennensis (Harenna mouse); M. haussa (Hausa mouse); M. indutus (Desert pygmy mouse); M. macedonicus (Macedonian mouse); M. mahomet (Mahomet mouse); M. mattheyi (Matthey's mouse); M. mayori (Mayor's mouse); M. minutoides (African pygmy mouse, pictured); M. musculoides (Temminck's mouse); M. musculus (House mouse); M. neavei (Neave's mouse); M. oubanguii (Oubangui mouse); M. pahari (Gairdner's shrewmouse); M. phillipsi (Phillips's mouse); M. platythrix (Stone-loving mouse); M. saxicola (Rock-loving mouse); M. setulosus (Peters's mouse); M. setzeri (Setzer's pygmy mouse); M. shortridgei (Shortridge's mouse); M. sorella (Thomas's pygmy mouse); M. spicilegus (Steppe mouse); M. spretus (Algerian mouse); M. tenellus (Delicate mouse); M. terricolor (Earth-colored mouse); M. triton (Gray-bellied pygmy mouse); M. vulcani (Volcano mouse)	Africa, Europe, and Asia	Size range: 4 cm (2 in) long, plus 2 cm (0.8 in) tail (African pygmy mouse) to 13 cm (5 in) long, plus 9 cm (4 in) tail (stone-loving mouse) Habitats: Grassland Diets: Seeds, roots, leaves, stems, and other vegetation, as well as insects and some meat
Musseromys (tree-mouse)	Heaney, Balete, Rickart, Veluz, & Jansa, 2009 Four species: M. anacuao (Sierra Madre tree-mouse); M. beneficus (Mount Pulag tree-mouse); M. gulantang (Banahaw tree mouse); M. inopinatus (Amuyao tree-mouse)	Philippines	Size range: 7–9 cm (3–4 in) long, plus 8 cm (3 in) tail (Mount Pulag tree-mouse) Habitats: Forest Diets: Plant material and invertebrates
Mylomys (groove-toothed rat)	Thomas, 1906 Two species: M. dybowskii (African groove-toothed rat); M. rex (Ethiopian mylomys)	Northern Sub-Saharan Africa	Size range: 12 cm (5 in) long, plus 10 cm (4 in) tail (African groove-toothed rat) to 21 cm (8 in) long, plus 18 cm (7 in) tail (Ethiopian mylomys) Habitats: Savanna and forest Diets: Grass and leaves
Myomyscus (white-footed rat)	Shortridge, 1942 Four species: M. angolensis (Myomyscus angolensis); M. brockmani (Brockman's rock mouse); M. verreauxii (Verreaux's mouse, pictured); M. yemeni (Yemeni mouse)	Sub-Saharan Africa, southern Saudi Arabia and Yemen	Size range: 7 cm (3 in) long, plus 15 cm (6 in) tail (Yemeni mouse) to 13 cm (5 in) long, plus 18 cm (7 in) tail (Brockman's rock mouse) Habitats: Savanna, rocky areas, and shrubland Diets: Insects, leaves, and shoots
Nesokia (short-tailed bandicoot rat)	Gray, 1842 Two species: N. bunnii (Bunn's short-tailed bandicoot rat); N. indica (Short-tailed bandicoot rat, pictured)	Scattered Asia and Egypt	Size range: 15 cm (6 in) long, plus 9 cm (4 in) tail (short-tailed bandicoot rat) to 26 cm (10 in) long, plus 27 cm (11 in) tail (Bunn's short-tailed bandicoot rat) Habitats: Forest, inland wetlands, shrubland, and grassland Diets: Grass, grain, roots, fruit, and vegetables
Nesoromys	Thomas, 1922 One species: N. ceramicus (Ceram rat)	Seram Island in Indonesia	Size: 11–14 cm (4–6 in) long, plus 12–14 cm (5–6 in) tail Habitats: Forest Diet: Plant material and invertebrates
Nilopegamys	Osgood, 1928 One species: N. plumbeus (Ethiopian amphibious rat)	Ethiopia	Size: About 15 cm (6 in) Habitats: Inland wetlands Diet: Plant material and invertebrates
Niviventer (white-bellied rat)	Marshall, 1976 Seventeen species: N. andersoni (Anderson's white-bellied rat); N. brahma (Brahma white-bellied rat); N. cameroni (Cameron Highlands white-bellied rat); N. confucianus (Chinese white-bellied rat); N. coninga (Coxing's white-bellied rat); N. cremoriventer (Dark-tailed tree rat); N. culturatus (Oldfield white-bellied rat); N. eha (Smoke-bellied rat); N. excelsior (Large white-bellied rat); N. fraternus (Montane Sumatran white-bellied rat); N. fulvescens (Chestnut white-bellied rat); N. hinpoon (Limestone rat); N. langbianis (Lang Bian white-bellied rat); N. lepturus (Narrow-tailed white-bellied rat); N. niviventer (White-bellied rat, pictured); N. rapit (Long-tailed mountain rat); N. tenaster (Tenasserim white-bellied rat)	Eastern, southern, and southeastern Asia	Size range: 10 cm (4 in) long, plus 15 cm (6 in) tail (chestnut white-bellied rat) to 21 cm (8 in) long, plus 19 cm (7 in) tail (Chinese white-bellied rat) Habitats: Forest and shrubland Diets: Plant material and invertebrates
Notomys (hopping mouse)	Lesson, 1842 Ten species: N. alexis (Spinifex hopping mouse); N. amplus † (Short-tailed hopping mouse); N. aquilo (Northern hopping mouse, pictured); N. cervinus (Fawn hopping mouse); N. fuscus (Dusky hopping mouse); N. longicaudatus † (Long-tailed hopping mouse); N. macrotis † (Big-eared hopping mouse); N. mitchellii (Mitchell's hopping mouse); N. mordax † (Darling Downs hopping mouse); N. robustus † (Great hopping mouse)	Australia	Size range: 7 cm (3 in) long, plus 11 cm (4 in) tail (dusky hopping mouse) to 13 cm (5 in) long, plus 16 cm (6 in) tail (Mitchell's hopping mouse) Habitats: Savanna, grassland, desert, forest, rocky areas, and shrubland Diets: Berries, leaves, seeds, and other vegetation
Oenomys (rufous-nosed rat)	Thomas, 1904 Two species: O. hypoxanthus (Common rufous-nosed rat, pictured); O. ornatus (Ghana rufous-nosed rat)	Central and western Africa	Size range: 13–19 cm (5–7 in) long, plus 15–20 cm (6–8 in) tail (common rufous-nosed rat) Habitats: Savanna, forest, grassland, and shrubland Diets: Vegetation, as well as insects
Otomys (vlei rat)	F. Cuvier, 1824 28 species: O. anchietae (Angolan vlei rat); O. angoniensis (Angoni vlei rat); O. auratus (South East African vlei rat); O. barbouri (Barbour's vlei rat); O. burtoni (Burton's vlei rat); O. cheesmani (Cheesman's vlei rat); O. cuanzensis (Cuanza vlei rat); O. dartmouthi (Ruwenzori vlei rat); O. denti (Dent's vlei rat); O. dollmani (Dollman's vlei rat); O. fortior (Charada vlei rat); O. helleri (Heller's vlei rat); O. irroratus (Southern African vlei rat); O. jacksoni (Mount Elgon vlei rat); O. karoensis (Fynbos vlei rat); O. lacustris (Tanzanian vlei rat); O. laminatus (Laminate vlei rat); O. occidentalis (Western vlei rat); O. orestes (Afroalpine vlei rat, pictured); O. simiensis (Simien vlei rat); O. sloggetti (Sloggett's vlei rat); O. thomasi (Thomas's vlei rat); O. tropicalis (Tropical vlei rat); O. typus (Ethiopian vlei rat); O. unisulcatus (Karoo vlei rat); O. uzungwensis (Uzungwe vlei rat); O. yaldeni (Yalden's vlei rat); O. zinki (Mount Kilimanjaro vlei rat)	Sub-Saharan Africa	Size range: 11 cm (4 in) long, plus 8 cm (3 in) tail (Fynbos vlei rat) to 22 cm (9 in) long, plus 13 cm (5 in) tail (Angolan vlei rat) Habitats: Savanna, grassland, forest, inland wetlands, rocky areas, and shrubland Diets: Grass, semiaquatic plants, and shoots, as well as grain, seeds, berries, roots, and bark
Palawanomys	Musser & Newcomb, 1983 One species: P. furvus (Palawan soft-furred mountain rat)	Philippines	Size: 13–16 cm (5–6 in) long, plus 14–17 cm (6–7 in) tail Habitats: Forest Diet: Plant material and invertebrates
Papagomys	Sody, 1941 One species: P. armandvillei (Flores giant rat)	Indonesia	Size: 27–43 cm (11–17 in) long, plus 26–36 cm (10–14 in) tail Habitats: Forest Diet: Unknown
Parahydromys	Poche, 1906 One species: P. asper (New Guinea waterside rat)	New Guinea	Size: 21–23 cm (8–9 in) long, plus 23–27 cm (9–11 in) tail Habitats: Inland wetlands and forest Diet: Insects and other invertebrates
Paraleptomys (short-haired water rat)	Tate & Archbold, 1941 Two species: P. rufilatus (Northern water rat); P. wilhelmina (Short-haired water rat)	New Guinea	Size range: 10 cm (4 in) long, plus 12 cm (5 in) tail (short-haired water rat) to 14 cm (6 in) long, plus 15 cm (6 in) tail (northern water rat) Habitats: Forest Diets: Plant material and invertebrates
Paramelomys (long-nosed mosaic-tailed rat)	Rümmler, 1936 Nine species: P. gressitti (Gressitt's mosaic-tailed rat); P. levipes (Long-nosed mosaic-tailed rat); P. lorentzii (Lorentz's mosaic-tailed rat); P. mollis (Thomas's mosaic-tailed rat); P. moncktoni (Moncton's mosaic-tailed rat); P. naso (Long-nosed paramelomys); P. platyops (Lowland mosaic-tailed rat, pictured); P. rubex (Mountain mosaic-tailed rat); P. steini (Stein's paramelomys)	New Guinea and nearby islands	Size range: 10 cm (4 in) long, plus 9 cm (4 in) tail (mountain mosaic-tailed rat) to 20 cm (8 in) long, plus 13 cm (5 in) tail (long-nosed paramelomys) Habitats: Savanna and forest Diets: Fruit, berries, and other vegetation
Parotomys (whistling rat)	Thomas, 1918 Two species: P. brantsii (Brants's whistling rat, pictured); P. littledalei (Littledale's whistling rat)	Southern Africa	Size range: 12–17 cm (5–7 in) long, plus 8–11 cm (3–4 in) tail (Littledale's whistling rat) Habitats: Desert and shrubland Diets: Grass, seeds, and shoots
Paucidentomys	Rowe, Achmadi, & Esselstyn, 2012 One species: P. vermidax (Edented Sulawesi rat)	Indonesia	Size: 15–17 cm (6–7 in) long, plus 19–20 cm (7–8 in) tail Habitats: Forest Diet: Plant material and invertebrates
Paulamys	Musser, 1986 One species: P. naso (Paulamys)	Indonesia	Size: About 16 cm (6 in) Habitats: Forest Diet: Insects, snails, worms, fungi, and fruit
Pelomys (groove-toothed swamp rat)	Peters, 1852 Five species: P. campanae (Bell groove-toothed swamp rat); P. fallax (Creek groove-toothed swamp rat); P. hopkinsi (Hopkins's groove-toothed swamp rat); P. isseli (Issel's groove-toothed swamp rat); P. minor (Least groove-toothed swamp rat)	Central Africa	Size range: 10 cm (4 in) long, plus 10 cm (4 in) tail (least groove-toothed swamp rat) to 17 cm (7 in) long, plus 15 cm (6 in) tail (bell groove-toothed swamp rat) Habitats: Savanna, inland wetlands, and grassland Diets: Grass, swamp vegetation, and grains
Phloeomys (slender-tailed cloud rat)	Waterhouse, 1839 Two species: P. cumingi (Southern giant slender-tailed cloud rat); P. pallidus (Northern Luzon giant cloud rat)	Philippines	Size range: 39 cm (15 in) long, plus 32 cm (13 in) tail (northern Luzon giant cloud rat) to 44 cm (17 in) long, plus 31 cm (12 in) tail (southern giant slender-tailed cloud rat) Habitats: Forest and shrubland Diets: Vegetation
Pithecheir (tree rat)	Lesson, 1840 Two species: P. melanurus (Red tree rat); P. parvus (Malayan tree rat)	Malaysia and Indonesia	Size range: 12–18 cm (5–7 in) long, plus 15–22 cm (6–9 in) tail (Malayan tree rat) Habitats: Forest Diets: Vegetation and insects
Pithecheirops	Emmons, 1993 One species: P. otion (Bornean pithecheirops)	Eastern Malaysia	Size: About 11 cm (4 in) Habitats: Forest Diet: Plant material and invertebrates
Pogonomelomys (lowland brush mouse)	Rümmler, 1936 Three species: P. brassi (Grey pogonomelomys); P. bruijni (Lowland brush mouse, pictured); P. mayeri (Shaw Mayer's brush mouse)	New Guinea	Size range: 13 cm (5 in) long, plus 15 cm (6 in) tail (Shaw Mayer's brush mouse) to 18 cm (7 in) long, plus 20 cm (8 in) tail (grey pogonomelomys) Habitats: Forest Diets: Plant material and invertebrates
Pogonomys (prehensile-tailed rat)	A. Milne-Edwards, 1877 Five species: P. championi (Champion's tree mouse); P. fergussoniensis (D'Entrecasteaux Archipelago pogonomys); P. loriae (Large tree mouse); P. macrourus (Chestnut tree mouse, pictured); P. sylvestris (Gray-bellied tree mouse)	Northern Australia and New Guinea and nearby islands	Size range: 9 cm (4 in) long, plus 12 cm (5 in) tail (chestnut tree mouse) to 20 cm (8 in) long, plus 26 cm (10 in) tail (D'Entrecasteaux Archipelago pogonomys) Habitats: Forest Diets: Leaves and grass and bamboo shoots
Praomys (soft-furred mouse)	Thomas, 1915 Seventeen species: P. coetzeei (Coetzee's soft-furred mouse); P. daltoni (Dalton's mouse, pictured); P. degraaffi (De Graaff's soft-furred mouse); P. delectorum (Delectable soft-furred mouse); P. derooi (Deroo's mouse); P. hartwigi (Hartwig's soft-furred mouse); P. jacksoni (Jackson's soft-furred mouse); P. lukolelae (Lukolela swamp rat); P. minor (Least soft-furred mouse); P. misonnei (Misonne's soft-furred mouse); P. morio (Cameroon soft-furred mouse); P. mutoni (Muton's soft-furred mouse); P. obscurus (Gotel Mountain soft-furred mouse); P. petteri (Petter's soft-furred mouse); P. rostratus (Forest soft-furred mouse); P. tullbergi (Tullberg's soft-furred mouse); P. verschureni (Verschuren's swamp rat)	Sub-Saharan Africa	Size range: 8 cm (3 in) long, plus 10 cm (4 in) tail (least soft-furred mouse) to 15 cm (6 in) long, plus 18 cm (7 in) tail (forest soft-furred mouse) Habitats: Savanna, grassland, inland wetlands, forest, and rocky areas Diets: Fruit, seeds, vegetation, and insects
Protochromys	Menzies, 1996 One species: P. fellowsi (Red-bellied mosaic-tailed rat)	Papua New Guinea	Size: 13–18 cm (5–7 in) long, plus 18–21 cm (7–8 in) tail Habitats: Forest Diet: Fruit, berries, and other vegetation
Pseudohydromys (moss mouse)	Rümmler, 1934 Twelve species: P. berniceae (Bishop's moss mouse); P. carlae (Huon small-toothed moss mouse); P. elanorae (Laurie's moss mouse); P. ellermani (One-toothed shrew mouse); P. fuscus (Mottled-tailed shrew mouse); P. germani (German's one-toothed moss mouse); P. murinus (Eastern shrew mouse); P. musseri (Musser's shrew mouse); P. occidentalis (Western shrew mouse); P. patriciae (Woolley's moss mouse); P. pumehanae (Southern small-toothed moss mouse); P. sandrae (White-bellied moss mouse)	New Guinea	Size range: 7 cm (3 in) long, plus 7 cm (3 in) tail (Laurie's moss mouse) to 12 cm (5 in) long, plus 10 cm (4 in) tail (western shrew mouse) Habitats: Forest, grassland, and shrubland Diets: Insects
Pseudomys (pebble-mound mouse)	Gray, 1832 23 species: P. albocinereus (Ash-grey mouse); P. apodemoides (Silky mouse); P. auritus † (Long-eared mouse); P. australis (Plains rat); P. bolami (Bolam's mouse); P. calabyi (Kakadu pebble-mound mouse); P. chapmani (Western pebble-mound mouse); P. delicatulus (Little native mouse); P. desertor (Desert mouse); P. fumeus (Smoky mouse); P. glaucus † (Blue-gray mouse); P. gouldii (Gould's mouse); P. gracilicaudatus (Eastern chestnut mouse); P. hermannsburgensis (Sandy inland mouse); P. higginsi (Long-tailed mouse); P. johnsoni (Central pebble-mound mouse); P. nanus (Western chestnut mouse); P. novaehollandiae (New Holland mouse); P. occidentalis (Western mouse); P. oralis (Hastings River mouse); P. patrius (Country mouse); P. pilligaensis (Pilliga mouse); P. shortridgei (Heath mouse, pictured)	Australia and Papua New Guinea	Size range: 5 cm (2 in) long, plus 7 cm (3 in) tail (Bolam's mouse) to 16 cm (6 in) long, plus 14 cm (6 in) tail (Hastings River mouse) Habitats: Savanna, grassland, desert, forest, inland wetlands, rocky areas, and shrubland Diets: Seeds, roots, other vegetation, and insects
Rattus (rat)	Fischer von Waldheim, 1803 68 species: R. adustus (Sunburned rat); R. andamanensis (Sikkim rat); R. annandalei (Annandale's rat); R. arfakiensis (Vogelkop mountain rat); R. argentiventer (Ricefield rat); R. arrogans (Western New Guinea mountain rat); R. baluensis (Summit rat); R. blangorum (Aceh rat); R. bontanus (Bonthain rat); R. burrus (Nonsense rat); R. colletti (Dusky rat); R. detentus (Manus Island spiny rat); R. elaphinus (Sula rat); R. enganus (Enggano rat); R. everetti (Philippine forest rat); R. exulans (Polynesian rat); R. facetus (Lore Lindu xanthurus rat); R. feliceus (Spiny Ceram rat); R. fuscipes (Bush rat); R. giluwensis (Giluwe rat); R. hainaldi (Hainald's Flores Island Rat); R. hoffmanni (Hoffmann's rat); R. hoogerwerfi (Hoogerwerf's rat); R. jobiensis (Japen rat); R. koopmani (Koopman's rat); R. korinchi (Korinch's rat); R. leucopus (Cape York rat); R. losea (Lesser ricefield rat); R. lugens (Mentawai rat); R. lutreolus (Australian swamp rat); R. macleari † (Maclear's rat); R. marmosurus (Opossum rat); R. mindorensis (Mindoro black rat); R. mollicomulus (Little soft-furred rat); R. montanus (Nillu rat); R. mordax (Eastern rat); R. morotaiensis (Moluccan prehensile-tailed rat); R. nativitatis † (Bulldog rat); R. niobe (Moss-forest rat); R. nitidus (Himalayan field rat); R. norvegicus (Brown rat, pictured); R. novaeguineae (New Guinean rat); R. omichlodes (Arianus's rat); R. osgoodi (Osgood's rat); R. palmarum (Palm rat); R. pelurus (Peleng rat); R. pococki (Pocock's highland rat); R. praetor (Large New Guinea spiny rat); R. pyctoris (Turkestan rat); R. ranjiniae (Kerala rat); R. rattus (Black rat); R. richardsoni (Glacier rat); R. salocco (Southeastern xanthurus rat); R. sanila (New Ireland forest rat); R. satarae (Sahyadris forest rat); R. simalurensis (Simalur rat); R. sordidus (Dusky field rat); R. steini (Stein's rat); R. stoicus (Andaman rat); R. tanezumi (Tanezumi rat); R. tawitawiensis (Tawitawi forest rat); R. timorensis (Timor rat); R. tiomanicus (Malayan field rat); R. tunneyi (Pale field rat); R. vandeuseni (Van Deusen's rat); R. verecundus (Slender rat); R. villosissimus (Long-haired rat); R. xanthurus (Yellow-tailed rat)	Europe, Asia, Africa, and Australia	Size range: 6 cm (2 in) long, plus 7 cm (3 in) tail (dusky rat) to 29 cm (11 in) long, plus 25 cm (10 in) tail (brown rat) Habitats: Coastal marine, savanna, grassland, desert, intertidal marine, inland wetlands, forest, rocky areas, and shrubland Diets: A wide variety of plant, insects, and animals
Rhabdomys (four-striped grass rat)	Thomas, 1916 Four species: R. bechuanae (West-central four-striped grass rat, pictured); R. dilectus (Mesic four-striped grass rat); R. intermedius (Karoo four-striped grass rat); R. pumilio (Four-striped grass mouse)	Sub-Saharan Africa	Size range: 9–14 cm (4–6 in) long, plus 9–13 cm (4–5 in) tail (four-striped grass mouse) Habitats: Savanna, grassland, and shrubland Diets: Roots, seeds, berries, and grains, as well as insects and eggs
Rhynchomys (shrewlike rat)	Thomas, 1895 Four species: R. banahao (Banahao shrew-rat); R. isarogensis (Isarog shrew-rat); R. soricoides (Mount Data shrew-rat, pictured); R. tapulao (Tapulao shrew-rat)	Philippines	Size range: 16 cm (6 in) long, plus 12 cm (5 in) tail (Tapulao shrew-rat) to 20 cm (8 in) long, plus 17 cm (7 in) tail (Mount Data shrew-rat) Habitats: Forest Diets: Insects and worms
Saxatilomys	Musser, 2005 One species: S. paulinae (Paulina's limestone rat)	Indonesia	Size: 15–17 cm (6–7 in) long, plus 18–20 cm (7–8 in) tail Habitats: Forest and rocky areas Diet: Plant material and invertebrates
Solomys (naked-tailed rat)	Thomas, 1922 Four species: S. ponceleti (Poncelet's giant rat); S. salamonis (Ugi naked-tailed rat); S. salebrosus (Bougainville naked-tailed rat); S. sapientis (Isabel naked-tailed rat)	Solomon Islands and Papua New Guinea	Size range: 18 cm (7 in) long, plus 19 cm (7 in) tail (Isabel naked-tailed rat) to 33 cm (13 in) long, plus 25 cm (10 in) tail (Bougainville naked-tailed rat) Habitats: Forest Diets: Coconuts and nuts
Sommeromys	Musser & Durden, 2002 One species: S. macrorhinos (Sommer's Sulawesi rat)	Indonesia	Size: 9–11 cm (4 in) long, plus 17–20 cm (7–8 in) tail Habitats: Forest Diet: Plant material and invertebrates
Soricomys (shrew mouse)	Balete, Rickart, Heaney, Alviola, Duya, Duya, Sosa, & Jansa, 2012 Four species: S. kalinga (Kalinga shrew mouse, pictured); S. leonardicoi (Co's shrew mouse); S. montanus (Southern Cordillera shrew mouse); S. musseri (Sierra Madre shrew mouse)	Philippines	Size range: 9–12 cm (4–5 in) long, plus 8–10 cm (3–4 in) tail (Co's shrew mouse) Habitats: Forest Diets: Worms and soft-bodied invertebrates
Srilankamys	Musser, 1981 One species: S. ohiensis (Ohiya rat)	Sri Lanka	Size: About 15 cm (6 in) Habitats: Forest Diet: Plant material and invertebrates
Stenocephalemys (narrow-headed rat)	Frick, 1914 Four species: S. albipes (Ethiopian white-footed mouse); S. albocaudata (Ethiopian narrow-headed rat, pictured); S. griseicauda (Gray-tailed narrow-headed rat); S. ruppi (Rupp's mouse)	Ethiopia	Size range: 10–20 cm (4–8 in) long, plus 11–18 cm (4–7 in) tail (Ethiopian narrow-headed rat) Habitats: Forest, grassland, and shrubland Diets: Insects, leaves, and shoots
Stochomys	Thomas, 1926 One species: S. longicaudatus (Target rat)	Central Africa	Size: 10–17 cm (4–7 in) long, plus 18–23 cm (7–9 in) tail Habitats: Forest Diet: Fruit, as well as vegetation and insects
Sundamys (giant Sunda rat)	Musser & Newcomb, 1983 Three species: S. infraluteus (Mountain giant Sunda rat); S. maxi (Bartels's rat); S. muelleri (Müller's giant Sunda rat)	Indonesia and Malaysia, Southeastern Asia, and Indonesia	Size range: 18–30 cm (7–12 in) long, plus 21–37 cm (8–15 in) tail (Müller's giant Sunda rat) Habitats: Forest and shrubland Diets: Fruit, leaves, shoots, insects, crabs, snails, and lizards
Taeromys (Sulawesi rat)	Sody, 1841 Eight species: T. arcuatus (Salokko rat); T. callitrichus (Lovely-haired rat, pictured); T. celebensis (Celebes rat); T. dominator (Giant Sulawesi rat); T. hamatus (Sulawesi montane rat); T. microbullatus (Small-eared rat); T. punicans (Sulawesi forest rat); T. taerae (Tondano rat)	Indonesia	Size range: 18 cm (7 in) long, plus 15 cm (6 in) tail (Sulawesi forest rat) to 28 cm (11 in) long, plus 33 cm (13 in) tail (giant Sulawesi rat) Habitats: Forest Diets: Fruit; Fruit, leaves, and insects
Tarsomys (long-footed rat)	Mearns, 1905 Two species: T. apoensis (Long-footed rat); T. echinatus (Spiny long-footed rat)	Philippines	Size range: 13 cm (5 in) long, plus 11 cm (4 in) tail (long-footed rat) to 18 cm (7 in) long, plus 16 cm (6 in) tail (spiny long-footed rat) Habitats: Forest Diets: Invertebrates
Tateomys (long-tailed shrew rat)	Musser, 1969 Two species: T. macrocercus (Long-tailed shrew rat); T. rhinogradoides (Tate's shrew rat)	Indonesia	Size range: 11 cm (4 in) long, plus 16 cm (6 in) tail (long-tailed shrew rat) to 16 cm (6 in) long, plus 17 cm (7 in) tail (Tate's shrew rat) Habitats: Forest Diets: Worms
Thallomys (acacia rat)	Thomas, 1920 Four species: T. loringi (Loring's rat); T. nigricauda (Black-tailed tree rat, pictured); T. paedulcus (Acacia rat); T. shortridgei (Shortridge's rat)	Sub-Saharan Africa	Size range: 11–17 cm (4–7 in) long, plus 12–20 cm (5–8 in) tail (black-tailed tree rat) Habitats: Savanna, forest, and shrubland Diets: Buds, leaves, and seeds, as well as berries, roots, and insects
Thamnomys (thicket rat)	Thomas, 1907 Four species: T. kempi (Kemp's thicket rat); T. major (Hatt's thicket rat); T. schoutedeni (Schouteden's thicket rat); T. venustus (Charming thicket rat)	Central Africa	Size range: 11 cm (4 in) long, plus 17 cm (7 in) tail (Schouteden's thicket rat) to 18 cm (7 in) long, plus 23 cm (9 in) tail (Kemp's thicket rat) Habitats: Forest Diets: Leaves and seeds
Tokudaia (Ryūkyū spiny rat)	Kuroda, 1943 Three species: T. muenninki (Muennink's spiny rat); T. osimensis (Ryukyu spiny rat, pictured); T. tokunoshimensis (Tokunoshima spiny rat)	Southern islands in Japan	Size range: 10 cm (4 in) long, plus 8 cm (3 in) tail (Ryukyu spiny rat) to 18 cm (7 in) long, plus 14 cm (6 in) tail (Muennink's spiny rat) Habitats: Forest Diets: Plant material and invertebrates
Tonkinomys	Musser, Lunde, & Son, 2006 One species: T. daovantieni (Daovantien's limestone rat)	Vietnam	Size: 18–22 cm (7–9 in) long, plus 15–19 cm (6–7 in) tail Habitats: Forest, inland wetlands, and rocky areas Diet: Plant material and invertebrates
Tryphomys	Miller, 1910 One species: T. adustus (Luzon short-nosed rat)	Philippines	Size: 17–20 cm (7–8 in) long, plus 15–19 cm (6–7 in) tail Habitats: Forest and grassland Diet: Plant material and invertebrates
Uromys (giant rat)	Peters, 1867 Eleven species: U. anak (Giant naked-tailed rat); U. boeadii (Biak giant rat); U. caudimaculatus (Giant white-tailed rat, pictured); U. emmae (Emma's giant rat); U. hadrourus (Masked white-tailed rat); U. imperator (Emperor rat); U. neobritannicus (Bismarck giant rat); U. porculus (Guadalcanal rat); U. rex (King rat); U. siebersi (Great Key Island giant rat); U. vika (Vangunu giant rat)	Southeastern Asia and northern Australia	Size range: 17 cm (7 in) long, plus 18 cm (7 in) tail (masked white-tailed rat) to 38 cm (15 in) long, plus 36 cm (14 in) tail (giant white-tailed rat) Habitats: Inland wetlands, forest, and caves Diets: Coconuts, nuts, fruit, and flowers
Vandeleuria (long-tailed climbing mouse)	Gray, 1842 Three species: V. nilagirica (Nilgiri long-tailed tree mouse); V. nolthenii (Nolthenius's long-tailed climbing mouse); V. oleracea (Asiatic long-tailed climbing mouse, pictured)	Southern and southeastern Asia	Size range: 7 cm (3 in) long, plus 11 cm (4 in) tail (Asiatic long-tailed climbing mouse) to 13 cm (5 in) long, plus 13 cm (5 in) tail (Nolthenius's long-tailed climbing mouse) Habitats: Forest, grassland, and shrubland Diets: Fruit, buds, and shoorts
Vernaya	Anthony, 1941 One species: V. fulva (Red climbing mouse)	China	Size: 5–8 cm (2–3 in) long, plus 10–14 cm (4–6 in) tail Habitats: Forest Diet: Plant material and invertebrates
Waiomys	Rowe, Achmadi, & Esselstyn, 2014 One species: W. mamasae (Sulawesi water rat)	Indonesia	Size: About 13 cm (5 in) Habitats: Forest and inland wetlands Diet: Plant material and invertebrates
Xenuromys	Tate & Archbold, 1941 One species: X. barbatus (Mimic tree rat)	New Guinea	Size: 27–34 cm (11–13 in) long, plus 22–28 cm (9–11 in) tail Habitats: Forest and rocky areas Diet: Fruit, seeds, and insects
Xeromys	Thomas, 1889 One species: X. myoides (Water mouse)	Papua New Guinea and northern and eastern Australia	Size: 7–13 cm (3–5 in) long, plus 6–10 cm (2–4 in) tail Habitats: Intertidal marine, inland wetlands, coastal marine, and forest Diet: Insects, fish, lizards, and crabs
Zelotomys (broad-headed mouse)	Osgood, 1910 Two species: Z. hildegardeae (Hildegarde's broad-headed mouse); Z. woosnami (Woosnam's broad-headed mouse, pictured)	Central and southern Africa	Size range: 9–16 cm (4–6 in) long, plus 7–14 cm (3–6 in) tail (Woosnam's broad-headed mouse) Habitats: Inland wetlands, savanna, forest, and grassland Diets: Grain, as well as insects
Zyzomys (rock rat)	Thomas, 1909 Five species: Z. argurus (Common rock rat); Z. maini (Arnhem Land rock rat); Z. palatilis (Carpentarian rock rat); Z. pedunculatus (Central rock rat, pictured); Z. woodwardi (Kimberley rock rat)	Australia	Size range: 8 cm (3 in) long, plus 9 cm (4 in) tail (common rock rat) to 17 cm (7 in) long, plus 15 cm (6 in) tail (Arnhem Land rock rat) Habitats: Savanna, grassland, forest, rocky areas, and shrubland Diets: Fruit, seeds, other vegetation, and insects

===== Family Nesomyidae =====
Members of the Nesomyidae family are called nesomyids and include Malagasy rodents, climbing mice, African rock mice, pouched rats, and tufted-tailed rats. They are generally omnivores, and eat seeds, fruit, nuts, roots, stems, and insects. Nesomyidae comprises 67 extant species divided into 21 genera, grouped into six subfamilies: Cricetomyinae, containing 8 species of hamster-rats and pouched rats; Delanymyinae, containing a single species; Dendromurinae, containing 26 species of climbing mice and fat mice; Mystromyinae, containing a single species; Nesomyinae, containing 27 species of short-tailed rats, tufted-tailed rats, and big-footed mice; and Petromyscinae, containing 4 species of rock mice.

Subfamily Cricetomyinae – Roberts, 1951 – three genera
Name	Authority and species	Range	Size and ecology
Beamys (hamster-rat)	Thomas, 1909 Two species: B. hindei (Lesser hamster-rat, pictured); B. major (Greater hamster-rat)	Southeastern Africa	Size range: 12 cm (5 in) long, plus 11 cm (4 in) tail (lesser hamster-rat) to 18 cm (7 in) long, plus 15 cm (6 in) tail (greater hamster-rat) Habitats: Forest Diets: Seeds and fruit
Cricetomys (pouched rat)	Waterhouse, 1840 Four species: C. ansorgei (Southern giant pouched rat); C. emini (Emin's pouched rat); C. gambianus (Gambian pouched rat, pictured); C. kivuensis (Kivu giant pouched rat)	Central, western, and southern Africa	Size range: 28 cm (11 in) long, plus 25 cm (10 in) tail (Gambian pouched rat) to 41 cm (16 in) long, plus 45 cm (18 in) tail (southern giant pouched rat) Habitats: Forest and savanna Diets: Omnivorous, including fruit and nuts as well as vegetables, insects, crabs, and snails
Saccostomus	Peters, 1846 Two species: S. campestris (South African pouched mouse, pictured); S. mearnsi (Mearns's pouched mouse)	Eastern and southern Africa	Size range: 9–18 cm (4–7 in) long, plus 2–6 cm (1–2 in) tail (South African pouched mouse) Habitats: Savanna, grassland, desert, and shrubland Diets: Seeds, berries, grain, and nuts, as well as insects

Subfamily Delanymyinae – Musser & Carleton, 2005 – one genus
Name	Authority and species	Range	Size and ecology
Delanymys	Hayman, 1962 One species: D. brooksi (Delany's mouse)	Central Africa	Size: 5–7 cm (2–3 in) long, plus 8–12 cm (3–5 in) tail Habitats: Shrubland and inland wetlands Diet: Seeds

Subfamily Dendromurinae – Alston, 1876 – six genera
Name	Authority and species	Range	Size and ecology
Dendromus (climbing mouse)	Smith, 1829 Fourteen species: D. insignis (Montane African climbing mouse); D. kahuziensis (Mount Kahuzi climbing mouse); D. lachaisei (Lachaise's climbing mouse); D. leucostomus (Monard's African climbing mouse); D. lovati (Lovat's climbing mouse); D. melanotis (Gray climbing mouse); D. mesomelas (Brants's climbing mouse, pictured); D. messorius (Banana climbing mouse); D. mystacalis (Chestnut climbing mouse); D. nyasae (Kivu climbing mouse); D. nyikae (Nyika climbing mouse); D. oreas (Cameroon climbing mouse); D. ruppi (Rupp's African climbing mouse); D. vernayi (Vernay's climbing mouse)	Sub-Saharan Africa	Size range: 4 cm (2 in) long, plus 6 cm (2 in) tail (chestnut climbing mouse) to 10 cm (4 in) long, plus 9 cm (4 in) tail (Lovat's climbing mouse) Habitats: Shrubland, forest, savanna, desert, grassland, and inland wetlands Diets: Seeds, berries, insects, eggs, small lizards, and small birds
Dendroprionomys	Petter, 1966 One species: D. rousseloti (Velvet climbing mouse)	Republic of the Congo	Size: About 8 cm (3 in) Habitats: Unknown Diet: Insects
Malacothrix	Candolle, 1838 One species: M. typica (Gerbil mouse)	Southern Africa	Size: 6–9 cm (2–4 in) long, plus 2–5 cm (1–2 in) tail Habitats: Desert, shrubland, and savanna Diet: Green vegetation
Megadendromus	Dieterlen & Rupp, 1978 One species: M. nikolausi (Nikolaus's mouse)	Ethiopia	Size: 11–13 cm (4–5 in) long, plus 9–11 cm (4 in) tail Habitats: Shrubland Diet: Likely vegetation and insects
Prionomys	Dollman, 1910 One species: P. batesi (Dollman's tree mouse)	West-central Africa	Size: 7–9 cm (3–4 in) long, plus 10–12 cm (4–5 in) tail Habitats: Forest Diet: Insects
Steatomys (fat mouse)	Peters, 1846 Eight species: S. bocagei (Bocage's African fat mouse); S. caurinus (Northwestern fat mouse); S. cuppedius (Dainty fat mouse); S. jacksoni (Jackson's fat mouse); S. krebsii (Krebs's fat mouse); S. opimus (Pousargues African fat mouse); S. parvus (Tiny fat mouse); S. pratensis (Fat mouse, pictured)	Sub-Saharan Africa	Size range: 5 cm (2 in) long, plus 3 cm (1 in) tail (tiny fat mouse) to 13 cm (5 in) long, plus 8 cm (3 in) tail (Bocage's African fat mouse) Habitats: Shrubland, forest, savanna, and grassland Diets: Seeds, grass bulbs, and insects

Subfamily Mystromyinae – Vorontsov, 1966 – one genus
Name	Authority and species	Range	Size and ecology
Mystromys	Wagner, 1841 One species: M. albicaudatus (White-tailed rat)	Southern Africa	Size: 11–20 cm (4–8 in) long, plus 4–9 cm (2–4 in) tail Habitats: Shrubland and grassland Diet: Seeds, vegetable matter, and insects

Subfamily Nesomyinae – Forsyth Major, 1897 – nine genera
Name	Authority and species	Range	Size and ecology
Brachytarsomys (short-tailed rat)	Günther, 1875 Two species: B. albicauda (White-tailed antsangy, pictured); B. villosa (Hairy-tailed antsangy)	Northern and eastern Madagascar	Size range: 22 cm (9 in) long, plus 22 cm (9 in) tail (white-tailed antsangy) to 24 cm (9 in) long, plus 27 cm (11 in) tail (hairy-tailed antsangy) Habitats: Forest Diets: Fruit
Brachyuromys	Forsyth Major, 1896 Two species: B. betsileoensis (Betsileo short-tailed rat); B. ramirohitra (Gregarious short-tailed rat)	Eastern Madagascar	Size range: 14–19 cm (6–7 in) long, plus 7–10 cm (3–4 in) tail (Betsileo short-tailed rat) Habitats: Forest, grassland, inland wetlands, and shrubland Diets: Likely vegetation and insects
Eliurus (tufted-tailed rat)	A. Milne-Edwards, 1885 Twelve species: E. antsingy (Tsingy tufted-tailed rat); E. carletoni (Ankarana Special Reserve tufted-tailed rat); E. danieli (Daniel's tufted-tailed rat); E. ellermani (Ellerman's tufted-tailed rat); E. grandidieri (Grandidier's tufted-tailed rat); E. majori (Major's tufted-tailed rat); E. minor (Lesser tufted-tailed rat); E. myoxinus (Dormouse tufted-tailed rat, pictured); E. penicillatus (White-tipped tufted-tailed rat); E. petteri (Petter's tufted-tailed rat); E. tanala (Tanala tufted-tailed rat); E. webbi (Webb's tufted-tailed rat)	Madagascar	Size range: 10 cm (4 in) long, plus 11 cm (4 in) tail (lesser tufted-tailed rat) to 17 cm (7 in) long, plus 18 cm (7 in) tail (Grandidier's tufted-tailed rat) Habitats: Forest and shrubland Diets: Likely vegetation and insects
Gymnuromys	Forsyth Major, 1896 One species: G. roberti (Voalavoanala)	Eastern Madagascar	Size: 15–18 cm (6–7 in) long, plus 14–20 cm (6–8 in) tail Habitats: Forest Diet: Likely vegetation and insects
Hypogeomys	Grandidier, 1869 One species: H. antimena (Malagasy giant rat)	Western Madagascar	Size: 30–34 cm (12–13 in) long, plus 21–24 cm (8–9 in) tail Habitats: Forest Diet: Fruit
Macrotarsomys (big-footed mouse)	A. Milne-Edwards & Grandidier, 1898 Three species: M. bastardi (Bastard big-footed mouse, pictured); M. ingens (Greater big-footed mouse); M. petteri (Petter's big-footed mouse)	Madagascar	Size range: 8 cm (3 in) long, plus 12 cm (5 in) tail (bastard big-footed mouse) to 16 cm (6 in) long, plus 24 cm (9 in) tail (Petter's big-footed mouse) Habitats: Forest and shrubland Diets: Berries, fruit, seeds, roots, and stems
Monticolomys	Goodman & Carleton, 1996 One species: M. koopmani (Malagasy mountain mouse)	Madagascar	Size: 9–11 cm (4 in) long, plus 13–15 cm (5–6 in) tail Habitats: Forest Diet: Likely vegetation and insects
Nesomys (red forest rat)	Peters, 1870 Three species: N. audeberti (White-bellied nesomys, pictured); N. lambertoni (Western nesomys); N. rufus (Island mouse)	Western and eastern Madagascar	Size range: 17–20 cm (7–8 in) long, plus 16–18 cm (6–7 in) tail (island mouse) Habitats: Forest Diets: Fruit and nuts
Voalavo (voalavo)	Goodman & Carleton, 1998 Two species: V. antsahabensis (Eastern voalavo); V. gymnocaudus (Northern voalavo)	Central and northern Madagascar	Size range: 8–10 cm (3–4 in) long, plus 10–13 cm (4–5 in) tail (eastern voalavo) Habitats: Forest Diets: Likely vegetation and insects

Subfamily Petromyscinae – Roberts, 1951 – one genus
Name	Authority and species	Range	Size and ecology
Petromyscus (rock mouse)	Thomas, 1926 Four species: P. barbouri (Barbour's rock mouse); P. collinus (Pygmy rock mouse); P. monticularis (Brukkaros pygmy rock mouse); P. shortridgei (Shortridge's rock mouse)	Southern Africa	Size range: 6–10 cm (2–4 in) long, plus 6–9 cm (2–4 in) tail (Brukkaros pygmy rock mouse) Habitats: Rocky areas and shrubland Diets: Omnivorous

===== Family Platacanthomyidae =====
Members of the Platacanthomyidae family are called platacanthomyids or Oriental dormice. They generally eat fruit, seeds, grain, and roots. Platacanthomyidae comprises two extant species in two genera.

Not assigned to a named subfamily – two genera
Name	Authority and species	Range	Size and ecology
Platacanthomys	Blyth, 1859 One species: P. lasiurus (Malabar spiny dormouse)	Southern India	Size: 11–14 cm (4–6 in) long, plus 7–11 cm (3–4 in) tail Habitats: Forest Diet: Fruit, seeds, grain, and roots
Typhlomys	Milne-Edwards, 1877 One species: T. cinereus (Chinese pygmy dormouse)	Eastern China and northern Vietnam	Size: 7–8 cm (3 in) long, plus 9–11 cm (4 in) tail Habitats: Forest Diet: Vegetation

===== Family Spalacidae =====
Members of the Spalacidae family are called spalacids and include blind mole-rats, bamboo rats, mole-rats, and zokors. They are primarily herbivores, and eat roots, bulbs, tubers, grass, and seeds, with some species also eating insects. Spalacidae comprises 23 extant species in 7 genera, divided into 3 subfamilies: Myospalacinae contains 6 species of zokors, Rhizomyinae contains 6 species of bamboo rats and mole-rats, Spalacinae contains 11 species of blind mole-rats.

Subfamily Myospalacinae – Lilljeborg, 1866 – two genera
Name	Authority and species	Range	Size and ecology
Eospalax (Chinese zokor)	Allen, 1938 Three species: E. fontanierii (Chinese zokor, pictured); E. rothschildi (Rothschild's zokor); E. smithii (Smith's zokor)	Central China	Size range: 14 cm (6 in) long, plus 2 cm (0.8 in) tail (Rothschild's zokor) to 25 cm (10 in) long, plus 4 cm (2 in) tail (Smith's zokor) Habitats: Shrubland, grassland, and forest Diets: Roots and grains
Myospalax (zokor)	Laxmann, 1769 Three species: M. aspalax (False zokor); M. myospalax (Siberian zokor, pictured); M. psilurus (Transbaikal zokor)	Central Asia	Size range: 16 cm (6 in) long, plus 3 cm (1 in) tail (false zokor) to 27 cm (11 in) long, plus 5 cm (2 in) tail (Siberian zokor) Habitats: Shrubland, grassland, forest, and desert Diets: Roots and grains

Subfamily Rhizomyinae – Winge, 1887 – three genera
Name	Authority and species	Range	Size and ecology
Cannomys	Thomas, 1915 One species: C. badius (Lesser bamboo rat)	Southeastern Asia	Size: 14–26 cm (6–10 in) long, plus 4–10 cm (2–4 in) tail Habitats: Forest Diet: Shrubs, shoots, and roots
Rhizomys (bamboo rat)	Gray, 1831 Three species: R. pruinosus (Hoary bamboo rat); R. sinensis (Chinese bamboo rat); R. sumatrensis (Large bamboo rat, pictured)	Southern and southeastern Asia	Size range: 22 cm (9 in) long, plus 5 cm (2 in) tail (Chinese bamboo rat) to 48 cm (19 in) long, plus 20 cm (8 in) tail (large bamboo rat) Habitats: Grassland and forest Diets: Bamboo roots, as well as grass, seeds, and fruit
Tachyoryctes (African mole-rat)	Rüppell, 1835 Two species: T. macrocephalus (Giant root-rat, pictured); T. splendens (Northeast African mole-rat)	Eastern Africa	Size range: 15 cm (6 in) long, plus 4 cm (2 in) tail (northeast African mole-rat) to 31 cm (12 in) long, plus 7 cm (3 in) tail (giant root-rat) Habitats: Shrubland, grassland, savanna, and forest Diets: Roots, rhizomes, tubers, bulbs, and corms, as well as grass and legumes

Subfamily Spalacinae – Gray, 1821 – two genera
Name	Authority and species	Range	Size and ecology
Nannospalax (small-bodied mole-rat)	Palmer, 1903 Three species: N. ehrenbergi (Middle East blind mole-rat); N. leucodon (Lesser blind mole-rat, pictured); N. xanthodon (Anatolian blind mole-rat)	Southeastern Europe, Western Asia, and northeastern Africa	Size range: 13 cm (5 in) long, plus 0 cm (0 in) tail (Middle East blind mole-rat) to 25 cm (10 in) long (Anatolian blind mole-rat) Habitats: Shrubland, grassland, and desert Diets: Roots, tubers, acorns, plant stems, and other plant parts
Spalax (blind mole-rat)	Güldenstädt, 1770 Eight species: S. antiquus (Mehely's blind mole-rat); S. arenarius (Sandy blind mole-rat); S. giganteus (Giant blind mole-rat); S. graecus (Bukovina blind mole-rat); S. istricus (Oltenia blind mole-rat); S. microphthalmus (Greater blind mole-rat, pictured); S. uralensis (Kazakhstan blind mole-rat); S. zemni (Podolsk blind mole-rat)	Eastern Europe, Kazakhstan, and southwestern Russia	Size range: 19 cm (7 in) long, plus 0 cm (0 in) tail (greater blind mole-rat) to 35 cm (14 in) long (giant blind mole-rat) Habitats: Shrubland, grassland, and forest Diets: Roots, bulbs, tubers, grass, and seeds, as well as insects

=== Suborder Sciuromorpha ===
==== Family Aplodontiidae ====
Members of the Aplodontiidae family are called aplodontiids. It includes a single herbivorous species.

Not assigned to a named subfamily – one genus
Name	Authority and species	Range	Size and ecology
Aplodontia	Richardson, 1829 One species: A. rufa (mountain beaver)	Western United States and southwestern Canada	Size: 23–43 cm (9–17 in) long, plus 2–6 cm (1–2 in) tail Habitats: Forest, shrubland, and inland wetlands Diet: A wide variety of vegetation

==== Family Gliridae ====
Members of the Gliridae family are called glirids or dormice. They are omnivores and feed on fruit and nuts, as well as invertebrates, birds and their eggs, and small rodents. Gliridae comprises 29 extant species in 9 genera, divided into 3 subfamilies: Glirinae, containing two species; Graphiurinae, containing fifteen species; and Leithiinae, containing twelve species.

Subfamily Glirinae – Muirhead, 1819 – two genera
Name	Authority and species	Range	Size and ecology
Glirulus	Thomas, 1906 One species: G. japonicus (Japanese dormouse)	Japan	Size: 6–10 cm (2–4 in) long, plus 3–6 cm (1–2 in) tail Habitats: Forest Diet: Fruit and nuts, as well as invertebrates, birds and their eggs, and small rodents
Glis	Brisson, 1762 One species: G. glis (European edible dormouse)	Europe and western Asia	Size: 13–19 cm (5–7 in) long, plus 10–18 cm (4–7 in) tail Habitats: Forest and shrubland Diet: Fruit and nuts, as well as invertebrates, birds and their eggs, and small rodents

Subfamily Graphiurinae – Winge, 1887 – one genus
Name	Authority and species	Range	Size and ecology
Graphiurus (African dormouse)	Smuts, 1832 Fifteen species: G. angolensis (Angolan African dormouse); G. christyi (Christy's dormouse); G. crassicaudatus (Jentink's dormouse); G. johnstoni (Johnston's African dormouse); G. kelleni (Kellen's dormouse); G. lorraineus (Lorrain dormouse); G. microtis (Small-eared dormouse); G. monardi (Monard's dormouse); G. murinus (Woodland dormouse, pictured); G. nagtglasii (Nagtglas's African dormouse); G. ocularis (Spectacled dormouse); G. platyops (Rock dormouse); G. rupicola (Stone dormouse); G. surdus (Silent dormouse); G. walterverheyeni (Walter Verheyen's African dormouse)	Sub-Saharan Africa	Size range: 6 cm (2 in) long, plus 6 cm (2 in) tail (Johnston's African dormouse) to 16 cm (6 in) long, plus 13 cm (5 in) tail (Monard's dormouse) Habitats: Grassland, inland wetlands, rocky areas, savanna, shrubland, and forest Diets: Fruit and nuts, as well as invertebrates, birds and their eggs, and small rodents

Subfamily Leithiinae – Lydekker, 1896 – six genera
Name	Authority and species	Range	Size and ecology
Chaetocauda	Wang, 1985 One species: C. sichuanensis (Chinese dormouse)	Central China	Size: 9–10 cm (4 in) long, plus 9–11 cm (4 in) tail Habitats: Forest Diet: Fruit and nuts, as well as invertebrates, birds and their eggs, and small rodents
Dryomys (forest dormouse)	Thomas, 1905 Three species: D. laniger (Woolly dormouse); D. niethammeri (Balochistan forest dormouse); D. nitedula (Forest dormouse, pictured)	Eastern Europe and western and central Asia	Size range: 7 cm (3 in) long, plus 6 cm (2 in) tail (forest dormouse) to 11 cm (4 in) long, plus 9 cm (4 in) tail (Balochistan forest dormouse) Habitats: Shrubland, forest, and rocky areas Diets: Fruit and nuts, as well as invertebrates, birds and their eggs, and small rodents
Eliomys (garden dormouse)	Wagner, 1840 Three species: E. melanurus (Asian garden dormouse); E. munbyanus (Maghreb garden dormouse); E. quercinus (Garden dormouse, pictured)	Europe, western Asia, and northern Africa	Size range: 9 cm (4 in) long, plus 8 cm (3 in) tail (garden dormouse) to 15 cm (6 in) long, plus 14 cm (6 in) tail (Asian garden dormouse) Habitats: Desert, rocky areas, coastal marine, shrubland, and forest Diets: Fruit and nuts, as well as invertebrates, birds and their eggs, and small rodents
Muscardinus	Kaup, 1829 One species: M. avellanarius (Hazel dormouse)	Europe and western Asia	Size: 6–10 cm (2–4 in) long, plus 5–9 cm (2–4 in) tail Habitats: Forest Diet: Fruit and nuts, as well as invertebrates, birds and their eggs, and small rodents
Myomimus (mouse-tailed dormouse)	Ogniov, 1924 Three species: M. personatus (Masked mouse-tailed dormouse); M. roachi (Roach's mouse-tailed dormouse); M. setzeri (Setzer's mouse-tailed dormouse)	Western Asia and southeastern Europe	Size range: 6 cm (2 in) long, plus 6 cm (2 in) tail (Setzer's mouse-tailed dormouse) to 14 cm (6 in) long, plus 10 cm (4 in) tail (Roach's mouse-tailed dormouse) Habitats: Shrubland, forest, and savanna Diets: Fruit and nuts, as well as invertebrates, birds and their eggs, and small rodents
Selevinia	Belosludov & Bazhanov, 1939 One species: S. betpakdalaensis (Desert dormouse)	Kazakhstan	Size: 7–10 cm (3–4 in) long, plus 5–8 cm (2–3 in) tail Habitats: Desert Diet: Insects and spiders

==== Family Sciuridae ====
Members of the Sciuridae family are called sciurids and include squirrels, chipmunks, and marmots. They primarily feed on fruit, seeds, and nuts, though many species also eat insects, fungi, bark, eggs, and small vertebrates. Sciuridae comprises 284 extant species in 60 genera, divided into 5 subfamilies: Callosciurinae, containing 67 species of Asian squirrels; Ratufinae, containing 4 species of giant squirrels; Sciurillinae, containing a single species of pygmy squirrel; Sciurinae, containing 84 species of flying squirrel and tree squirrels; and Xerinae, containing 128 species of marmots, chipmunks, prairie dogs, and ground squirrels.

Subfamily Callosciurinae – Pocock, 1923 – fourteen genera
Name	Authority and species	Range	Size and ecology
Callosciurus (beautiful squirrel)	Gray, 1867 Fifteen species: C. adamsi (Ear-spot squirrel); C. albescens (Kloss's squirrel); C. baluensis (Kinabalu squirrel); C. caniceps (Grey-bellied squirrel); C. erythraeus (Pallas's squirrel); C. finlaysonii (Finlayson's squirrel); C. inornatus (Inornate squirrel); C. melanogaster (Mentawai squirrel); C. nigrovittatus (Black-striped squirrel, pictured); C. notatus (Plantain squirrel); C. orestes (Borneo black-banded squirrel); C. phayrei (Phayre's squirrel); C. prevostii (Prevost's squirrel); C. pygerythrus (Irrawaddy squirrel); C. quinquestriatus (Anderson's squirrel)	Southeastern and eastern Asia	Size range: 14 cm (6 in) long, plus 13 cm (5 in) tail (Borneo black-banded squirrel) to 29 cm (11 in) long, plus 21 cm (8 in) tail (Inornate squirrel) Habitats: Shrubland, inland wetlands, and forest Diets: Fruit, nuts, seeds, flowers, vegetation, insects, and eggs
Dremomys (red-cheeked squirrel)	Heude, 1898 Six species: D. everetti (Bornean mountain ground squirrel); D. gularis (Red-throated squirrel); D. lokriah (Orange-bellied Himalayan squirrel, pictured); D. pernyi (Perny's long-nosed squirrel); D. pyrrhomerus (Red-hipped squirrel); D. rufigenis (Asian red-cheeked squirrel)	Southern, southeastern, and eastern Asia	Size range: 15 cm (6 in) long, plus 9 cm (4 in) tail (Bornean mountain ground squirrel) to 22 cm (9 in) long, plus 17 cm (7 in) tail (red-throated squirrel) Habitats: Shrubland, rocky areas, and forest Diets: Fruit, nuts, vegetation, and insects
Exilisciurus (pygmy squirrel)	Moore, 1958 Three species: E. concinnus (Philippine pygmy squirrel); E. exilis (Least pygmy squirrel); E. whiteheadi (Tufted pygmy squirrel, pictured)	Southeastern Asia	Size range: 7 cm (3 in) long, plus 4 cm (2 in) tail (least pygmy squirrel) to 9 cm (4 in) long, plus 7 cm (3 in) tail (Philippine pygmy squirrel) Habitats: Forest Diets: Vegetation and insects
Funambulus (palm squirrel)	Lesson, 1835 Six species: F. layardi (Layard's palm squirrel); F. obscurus (Dusky striped squirrel); F. palmarum (Indian palm squirrel, pictured); F. pennantii (Northern palm squirrel); F. sublineatus (Nilgiri striped squirrel); F. tristriatus (Jungle palm squirrel)	Southern Asia	Size range: 10 cm (4 in) long, plus 7 cm (3 in) tail (dusky striped squirrel) to 16 cm (6 in) long, plus 15 cm (6 in) tail (jungle palm squirrel) Habitats: Shrubland, grassland, inland wetlands, and forest Diets: Seeds, nuts, bark, buds, leaves, flowers, and insects
Glyphotes	Thomas, 1898 One species: G. simus (Sculptor squirrel)	Borneo	Size: 9–15 cm (4–6 in) long, plus 9–11 cm (4 in) tail Habitats: Forest Diet: Fruit, nuts, seeds, flowers, vegetation, insects, and eggs
Hyosciurus	Archbold & Tate, 1935 Two species: H. heinrichi (Montane long-nosed squirrel); H. ileile (Lowland long-nosed squirrel)	Indonesia	Size range: 19 cm (7 in) long, plus 6 cm (2 in) tail (Montane long-nosed squirrel) to 25 cm (10 in) long, plus 13 cm (5 in) tail (Lowland long-nosed squirrel) Habitats: Shrubland and forest Diets: Fruit, nuts, and insects
Lariscus	Thomas & Wroughton, 1909 Four species: L. hosei (Four-striped ground squirrel); L. insignis (Three-striped ground squirrel, pictured); L. niobe (Niobe ground squirrel); L. obscurus (Mentawai three-striped squirrel)	Southeastern Asia	Size range: 18 cm (7 in) long, plus 8 cm (3 in) tail (Niobe ground squirrel) to 20 cm (8 in) long, plus 9 cm (4 in) tail (Mentawai three-striped squirrel) Habitats: Shrubland and forest Diets: Fruit and nuts
Menetes	Thomas, 1908 One species: M. berdmorei (Berdmore's ground squirrel)	Southeastern Asia	Size: About 18 cm (7 in) Habitats: Grassland, shrubland, and forest Diet: Fruit and nuts
Nannosciurus	Trouessart, 1880 One species: N. melanotis (Black-eared squirrel)	Southeastern Asia	Size: About 8 cm (3 in) Habitats: Forest Diet: Fruit and nuts
Prosciurillus	Ellerman, 1947 Seven species: P. abstrusus (Secretive dwarf squirrel); P. alstoni (Alston's squirrel); P. leucomus (Whitish dwarf squirrel); P. murinus (Celebes dwarf squirrel); P. rosenbergii (Sanghir squirrel, pictured); P. topapuensis (Mount Topapu squirrel); P. weberi (Weber's dwarf squirrel)	Indonesia and Philippines	Size range: 10 cm (4 in) long, plus 5 cm (2 in) tail (Celebes dwarf squirrel) to 20 cm (8 in) long, plus 18 cm (7 in) tail (Alston's squirrel) Habitats: Forest Diets: Fruit, nuts, bark, and resin
Rhinosciurus	Blyth, 1856 One species: R. laticaudatus (Shrew-faced squirrel)	Southeastern Asia	Size: 19–21 cm (7–8 in) long, plus 11–14 cm (4–6 in) tail Habitats: Forest Diet: Insects and earthworms, as well as fruit
Rubrisciurus	Ellerman, 1954 One species: R. rubriventer (Red-bellied squirrel)	Island of Sulawesi in Indonesia	Size: 15–30 cm (6–12 in) long, plus 18–25 cm (7–10 in) tail Habitats: Forest Diet: Fruit and seeds
Sundasciurus (Sunda squirrel)	Moore, 1958 Fifteen species: S. brookei (Brooke's squirrel); S. davensis (Davao squirrel); S. fraterculus (Fraternal squirrel); S. hippurus (Horse-tailed squirrel); S. hoogstraali (Busuanga squirrel); S. jentinki (Jentink's squirrel); S. juvencus (Northern Palawan tree squirrel); S. lowii (Low's squirrel); S. mindanensis (Mindanao squirrel); S. moellendorffi (Culion tree squirrel); S. philippinensis (Philippine tree squirrel); S. rabori (Palawan montane squirrel); S. samarensis (Samar squirrel); S. steerii (Southern Palawan tree squirrel); S. tenuis (Slender squirrel, pictured)	Southeastern Asia	Size range: 11 cm (4 in) long, plus 7 cm (3 in) tail (fraternal squirrel) to 25 cm (10 in) long, plus 25 cm (10 in) tail (horse-tailed squirrel) Habitats: Forest Diets: Fruit and vegetation, as well as insects
Tamiops (Asiatic striped squirrel)	Allen, 1906 Four species: T. maritimus (Maritime striped squirrel); T. mcclellandii (Himalayan striped squirrel, pictured); T. rodolphii (Cambodian striped squirrel); T. swinhoei (Swinhoe's striped squirrel)	Southeastern and eastern Asia	Size range: 11 cm (4 in) long, plus 10 cm (4 in) tail (Cambodian striped squirrel) to 13 cm (5 in) long, plus 11 cm (4 in) tail (maritime striped squirrel) Habitats: Shrubland, grassland, inland wetlands, and forest Diets: Fruit, nuts, seeds, and insects

Subfamily Ratufinae – Moore, 1959 – one genus
Name	Authority and species	Range	Size and ecology
Ratufa (giant squirrel)	Gray, 1867 Four species: R. affinis (Cream-coloured giant squirrel); R. bicolor (Black giant squirrel); R. indica (Indian giant squirrel); R. macroura (Grizzled giant squirrel, pictured)	Southern and southeastern Asia	Size range: 32 cm (13 in) long, plus 35 cm (14 in) tail (grizzled giant squirrel) to 45 cm (18 in) long, plus 49 cm (19 in) tail (Indian giant squirrel) Habitats: Forest Diets: Fruit, nuts, bark, insects, and eggs

Subfamily Sciurillinae – Moore, 1959 – one genus
Name	Authority and species	Range	Size and ecology
Sciurillus	Thomas, 1914 One species: S. pusillus (Neotropical pygmy squirrel)	Northern South America	Size: 8–12 cm (3–5 in) long, plus 8–12 cm (3–5 in) tail Habitats: Forest Diet: Fruit, nuts, bark, and resin

Subfamily Sciurinae – Hemprich, 1820 – 20 genera
Name	Authority and species	Range	Size and ecology
Aeretes	Allen, 1940 One species: A. melanopterus (Groove-toothed flying squirrel)	Central China	Size: 27–35 cm (11–14 in) long, plus 27–36 cm (11–14 in) tail Habitats: Forest Diet: Nuts, fruit, twigs, shoots, leaves, bark and insects
Aeromys (large black flying squirrel)	Robinson & Kloss, 1915 Two species: A. tephromelas (Black flying squirrel, pictured); A. thomasi (Thomas's flying squirrel)	Southeastern Asia and Indonesia and Malaysia	Size range: 30 cm (12 in) long, plus 37 cm (15 in) tail (Thomas's flying squirrel) to 38 cm (15 in) long, plus 44 cm (17 in) tail (black flying squirrel) Habitats: Forest Diets: Fruit, nuts, leaves, and insects
Belomys	Thomas, 1908 One species: B. pearsonii (Hairy-footed flying squirrel)	Southeastern and eastern Asia	Size: 18–21 cm (7–8 in) long, plus 13–17 cm (5–7 in) tail Habitats: Forest Diet: Nuts, fruit, twigs, shoots, leaves, bark and insects
Biswamoyopterus (Indochinese giant flying squirrel)	Saha, 1981 Two species: B. biswasi (Namdapha flying squirrel); B. laoensis (Laotian giant flying squirrel)	Laos and eastern India	Size range: 40 cm (16 in) long, plus 60 cm (24 in) tail (Namdapha flying squirrel) to 46 cm (18 in) long, plus 62 cm (24 in) tail (Laotian giant flying squirrel) Habitats: Forest Diets: Unknown
Eoglaucomys	Howell, 1915 One species: E. fimbriatus (Kashmir flying squirrel)	Central Asia	Size: 23–30 cm (9–12 in) long, plus 25–33 cm (10–13 in) tail Habitats: Forest Diet: Seeds, as well as shoots, buds, leaves, and nuts
Eupetaurus	Thomas, 1888 One species: E. cinereus (Western woolly flying squirrel)	Western China	Size: 42–61 cm (17–24 in) long, plus 38–54 cm (15–21 in) tail Habitats: Forest, rocky areas, and caves Diet: Moss and lichen
Glaucomys (New World flying squirrel)	Thomas, 1908 Two species: G. sabrinus (Northern flying squirrel); G. volans (Southern flying squirrel, pictured)	Eastern North America and Canada and northern United States	Size range: 11–19 cm (4–7 in) long, plus 12–16 cm (5–6 in) tail (Northern flying squirrel) Habitats: Forest Diets: Nuts, bark, lichen, fungi, fruit, and berries, as well as insects
Hylopetes (arrow-tailed flying squirrel)	Thomas, 1908 Nine species: H. alboniger (Particolored flying squirrel, pictured); H. bartelsi (Bartel's flying squirrel); H. nigripes (Palawan flying squirrel); H. phayrei (Indochinese flying squirrel); H. platyurus (Jentink's flying squirrel); H. sagitta (Arrow flying squirrel); H. sipora (Sipora flying squirrel); H. spadiceus (Red-cheeked flying squirrel); H. winstoni (Sumatran flying squirrel)	Southeastern and eastern Asia	Size range: 11 cm (4 in) long, plus 9 cm (4 in) tail (arrow flying squirrel) to 33 cm (13 in) long, plus 31 cm (12 in) tail (Palawan flying squirrel) Habitats: Shrubland and forest Diets: Nuts, shoots, leaves, fruit, insects, and small snakes
Iomys (Horsfield's flying squirrel)	Thomas, 1908 Two species: I. horsfieldii (Javanese flying squirrel, pictured); I. sipora (Mentawi flying squirrel)	Southeastern Asia and Indonesia	Size range: 16–23 cm (6–9 in) long, plus 15–23 cm (6–9 in) tail (Javanese flying squirrel) Habitats: Shrubland and forest Diets: Nuts, fruit, twigs, shoots, leaves, bark and insects
Microsciurus (dwarf squirrel)	Allen, 1895 Four species: M. alfari (Central American dwarf squirrel); M. flaviventer (Amazon dwarf squirrel, pictured); M. mimulus (Western dwarf squirrel); M. santanderensis (Santander dwarf squirrel)	Central America and northern South America	Size range: 10 cm (4 in) long, plus 8 cm (3 in) tail (Central American dwarf squirrel) to 16 cm (6 in) long, plus 15 cm (6 in) tail (Amazon dwarf squirrel) Habitats: Forest Diets: Fruit and nuts
Petaurillus (pygmy flying squirrel)	Thomas, 1908 Three species: P. emiliae (Lesser pygmy flying squirrel); P. hosei (Hose's pygmy flying squirrel); P. kinlochii (Selangor pygmy flying squirrel)	Borneo and Malaysia	Size range: 6 cm (2 in) long, plus 6 cm (2 in) tail (lesser pygmy flying squirrel) to 10 cm (4 in) long, plus 10 cm (4 in) tail (Selangor pygmy flying squirrel) Habitats: Forest Diets: Nuts, fruit, twigs, shoots, leaves, bark and insects
Petaurista (giant flying squirrel)	Link, 1795 Ten species: P. alborufus (Red and white giant flying squirrel, pictured); P. elegans (Spotted giant flying squirrel); P. leucogenys (Japanese giant flying squirrel); P. magnificus (Hodgson's giant flying squirrel); P. mechukaensis (Mechuka giant flying squirrel); P. mishmiensis (Mishmi giant flying squirrel); P. nobilis (Bhutan giant flying squirrel); P. petaurista (Red giant flying squirrel); P. philippensis (Indian giant flying squirrel); P. xanthotis (Chinese giant flying squirrel)	Asia	Size range: 27 cm (11 in) long, plus 28 cm (11 in) tail (Japanese giant flying squirrel) to 61 cm (24 in) long, plus 69 cm (27 in) tail (Indian giant flying squirrel) Habitats: Rocky areas and forest Diets: Fruit, nuts, twigs, shoots, and leaves, as well as insects
Petinomys (dwarf flying squirrel)	Thomas, 1908 Eight species: P. crinitus (Basilan flying squirrel); P. fuscocapillus (Travancore flying squirrel); P. genibarbis (Whiskered flying squirrel, pictured); P. hageni (Hagen's flying squirrel); P. lugens (Siberut flying squirrel); P. mindanensis (Mindanao flying squirrel); P. setosus (Temminck's flying squirrel); P. vordermanni (Vordermann's flying squirrel)	Southeastern Asia and southern India	Size range: 9 cm (4 in) long, plus 8 cm (3 in) tail (Temminck's flying squirrel) to 37 cm (15 in) long, plus 46 cm (18 in) tail (Mindanao flying squirrel) Habitats: Forest Diets: Nuts, fruit, twigs, shoots, and leaves, as well as bark and insects
Pteromys (Old World flying squirrel)	Cuvier, 1800 Two species: P. momonga (Japanese dwarf flying squirrel); P. volans (Siberian flying squirrel, pictured)	Japan, northern Asia, and northern Europe	Size range: 12–23 cm (5–9 in) long, plus 9–15 cm (4–6 in) tail (Siberian flying squirrel) Habitats: Forest Diets: Nuts, pine seeds, buds, bark, fruit, and insects
Pteromyscus	Thomas, 1908 One species: P. pulverulentus (Smoky flying squirrel)	Southeastern Asia	Size: 20–29 cm (8–11 in) long, plus 17–23 cm (7–9 in) tail Habitats: Forest Diet: Nuts, fruit, twigs, shoots, leaves, bark and insects
Rheithrosciurus	Gray, 1867 One species: R. macrotis (Tufted ground squirrel)	Borneo	Size: 33–35 cm (13–14 in) long, plus 30–34 cm (12–13 in) tail Habitats: Forest Diet: Fruit and nuts
Sciurus (tree squirrel)	Linnaeus, 1758 29 species: S. aberti (Abert's squirrel); S. aestuans (Brazilian squirrel); S. alleni (Allen's squirrel); S. anomalus (Caucasian squirrel); S. arizonensis (Arizona gray squirrel); S. aureogaster (Mexican gray squirrel); S. carolinensis (Eastern gray squirrel); S. colliaei (Collie's squirrel); S. deppei (Deppe's squirrel); S. flammifer (Fiery squirrel); S. gilvigularis (Yellow-throated squirrel); S. granatensis (Red-tailed squirrel); S. griseus (Western gray squirrel); S. ignitus (Bolivian squirrel); S. igniventris (Northern Amazon red squirrel); S. lis (Japanese squirrel); S. meridionalis (Calabrian black squirrel); S. nayaritensis (Mexican fox squirrel); S. niger (Fox squirrel); S. oculatus (Peters's squirrel); S. pucheranii (Andean squirrel); S. pyrrhinus (Junín red squirrel); S. richmondi (Richmond's squirrel); S. sanborni (Sanborn's squirrel); S. spadiceus (Southern Amazon red squirrel); S. stramineus (Guayaquil squirrel); S. variegatoides (Variegated squirrel); S. vulgaris (Red squirrel, pictured); S. yucatanensis (Yucatan squirrel)	North America, South America, Europe, and Asia	Size range: 14 cm (6 in) long, plus 11 cm (4 in) tail (Andean squirrel) to 56 cm (22 in) long, plus 27 cm (11 in) tail (Peters's squirrel) Habitats: Shrubland, grassland, and forest Diets: Nuts, seeds, fruit, buds, and tree shoots
Syntheosciurus	Bangs, 1902 One species: S. brochus (Bangs's mountain squirrel)	Costa Rica and Panama	Size: 15–19 cm (6–7 in) long, plus 12–16 cm (5–6 in) tail Habitats: Forest Diet: Flowers, buds, leaves, and sap
Tamiasciurus (American pine squirrel)	Trouessart, 1880 Three species: T. douglasii (Douglas squirrel); T. hudsonicus (American red squirrel, pictured); T. mearnsi (Mearns's squirrel)	North America	Size range: 18–19 cm (7 in) long, plus 11–15 cm (4–6 in) tail (multiple) Habitats: Forest Diets: Nuts, buds, fruit, bark, fungi, sap, eggs, and small vertebrates
Trogopterus	Heude, 1898 One species: T. xanthipes (Complex-toothed flying squirrel)	Southern China	Size: 20–33 cm (8–13 in) long, plus 26–30 cm (10–12 in) tail Habitats: Forest and caves Diet: Leaves, twigs, fruit, and nuts

Subfamily Xerinae – Osborn, 1910 – 24 genera
Name	Authority and species	Range	Size and ecology
Ammospermophilus (antelope squirrel)	Merriam, 1892 Four species: A. harrisii (Harris's antelope squirrel, pictured); A. interpres (Texas antelope squirrel); A. leucurus (White-tailed antelope squirrel); A. nelsoni (San Joaquin antelope squirrel)	Western United States and western Mexico	Size range: 18 cm (7 in) long, plus 4 cm (2 in) tail (white-tailed antelope squirrel) to 28 cm (11 in) long, plus 10 cm (4 in) tail (Harris's antelope squirrel) Habitats: Shrubland, grassland, desert, and forest Diets: Seeds, fruit, stems, and roots, as well as insects and carrion
Atlantoxerus	Forsyth Major, 1893 One species: A. getulus (Barbary ground squirrel)	Northwestern Africa	Size: About 17 cm (7 in) Habitats: Rocky areas, grassland, and shrubland Diet: Fruit and seeds
Callospermophilus (golden-mantled ground squirrel)	Merriam, 1897 Three species: C. lateralis (Golden-mantled ground squirrel, pictured); C. madrensis (Sierra Madre ground squirrel); C. saturatus (Cascade golden-mantled ground squirrel)	Western North America	Size range: 16 cm (6 in) long, plus 6 cm (2 in) tail (Sierra Madre ground squirrel) to 31 cm (12 in) long, plus 12 cm (5 in) tail (Cascade golden-mantled ground squirrel) Habitats: Shrubland, rocky areas, grassland, and forest Diets: Seeds, nuts, grains, roots, bulbs, fungi, vegetation, and insects, as well as small vertebrates and eggs
Cynomys (prairie dog)	Rafinesque, 1817 Five species: C. gunnisoni (Gunnison's prairie dog); C. leucurus (White-tailed prairie dog); C. ludovicianus (Black-tailed prairie dog, pictured); C. mexicanus (Mexican prairie dog); C. parvidens (Utah prairie dog)	Southern Canada, western United States, and northern Mexico	Size range: 29 cm (11 in) long, plus 4 cm (2 in) tail (Utah prairie dog) to 44 cm (17 in) long, plus 11 cm (4 in) tail (Mexican prairie dog) Habitats: Shrubland, savanna, grassland, and desert Diets: Herbs and grasses
Epixerus	Thomas, 1909 One species: E. ebii (Ebian's palm squirrel)	Western Africa	Size: 28–29 cm (11–11 in) long, plus about 28 cm (11 in) tail Habitats: Forest Diet: Fruit as well as insects
Eutamias	Trouessart, 1880 One species: E. sibiricus (Siberian chipmunk)	Northern and eastern Asia and Europe	Size: 14–15 cm (6 in) long, plus 10–12 cm (4–5 in) tail Habitats: Forest and shrubland Diet: Nuts and seeds, as well as buds, berries, grains, and fungi
Funisciurus (rope squirrel)	Trouessart, 1880 Ten species: F. anerythrus (Thomas's rope squirrel); F. bayonii (Lunda rope squirrel); F. carruthersi (Carruther's mountain squirrel); F. congicus (Congo rope squirrel, pictured); F. duchaillui (Du Chaillu's rope squirrel); F. isabella (Lady Burton's rope squirrel); F. lemniscatus (Ribboned rope squirrel); F. leucogenys (Red-cheeked rope squirrel); F. pyrropus (Fire-footed rope squirrel); F. substriatus (Kintampo rope squirrel)	Central and western Africa	Size range: 16 cm (6 in) long, plus 16 cm (6 in) tail (Congo rope squirrel) to 25 cm (10 in) long, plus 20 cm (8 in) tail (Lunda rope squirrel) Habitats: Shrubland, rocky areas, savanna, and forest Diets: Seeds, nuts, and fruit, as well as insects and eggs
Heliosciurus (sun squirrel)	Trouessart, 1880 Six species: H. gambianus (Gambian sun squirrel); H. mutabilis (Mutable sun squirrel); H. punctatus (Small sun squirrel); H. rufobrachium (Red-legged sun squirrel); H. ruwenzorii (Ruwenzori sun squirrel); H. undulatus (Zanj sun squirrel, pictured)	Sub-Saharan Africa	Size range: 18 cm (7 in) long, plus 20 cm (8 in) tail (small sun squirrel) to 24 cm (9 in) long, plus 27 cm (11 in) tail (Zanj sun squirrel) Habitats: Savanna and forest Diets: Seeds, nuts, fruit, insects, and eggs
Ictidomys (lined ground squirrel)	Allen, 1877 Two species: I. mexicanus (Mexican ground squirrel, pictured); I. tridecemlineatus (Thirteen-lined ground squirrel)	North America	Size range: 17 cm (7 in) long, plus 6 cm (2 in) tail (thirteen-lined ground squirrel) to 38 cm (15 in) long, plus 17 cm (7 in) tail (Mexican ground squirrel) Habitats: Shrubland, grassland, and coastal marine Diets: Seeds, nuts, grains, roots, bulbs, fungi, vegetation, and insects, as well as small vertebrates and eggs
Marmota (marmot)	Blumenbach, 1779 Fourteen species: M. baibacina (Gray marmot); M. bobak (Bobak marmot); M. broweri (Alaska marmot); M. caligata (Hoary marmot); M. camtschatica (Black-capped marmot); M. caudata (Long-tailed marmot); M. flaviventris (Yellow-bellied marmot); M. himalayana (Himalayan marmot); M. marmota (Alpine marmot); M. menzbieri (Menzbier's marmot); M. monax (Groundhog, pictured); M. olympus (Olympic marmot); M. sibirica (Tarbagan marmot); M. vancouverensis (Vancouver Island marmot)	Asia, Europe, United States, and Canada	Size range: 36 cm (14 in) long, plus 11 cm (4 in) tail (Tarbagan marmot) to 75 cm (30 in) long, plus 24 cm (9 in) tail (Olympic marmot) Habitats: Rocky areas, forest, grassland, shrubland, and desert Diets: Grass and forbs, as well as fruit, grains, legumes, and insects
Myosciurus	Thomas, 1909 One species: M. pumilio (African pygmy squirrel)	Western Africa	Size: 7–8 cm (3 in) long, plus 5–6 cm (2 in) tail Habitats: Forest Diet: Fruit, bark, and insects
Neotamias (chipmunk)	Howell, 1929 23 species: N. alpinus (Alpine chipmunk); N. amoenus (Yellow-pine chipmunk); N. bulleri (Buller's chipmunk); N. canipes (Gray-footed chipmunk); N. cinereicollis (Gray-collared chipmunk, pictured); N. dorsalis (Cliff chipmunk); N. durangae (Durango chipmunk); N. merriami (Merriam's chipmunk); N. minimus (Least chipmunk); N. obscurus (California chipmunk); N. ochrogenys (Yellow-cheeked chipmunk); N. palmeri (Palmer's chipmunk); N. panamintinus (Panamint chipmunk); N. quadrimaculatus (Long-eared chipmunk); N. quadrivittatus (Colorado chipmunk); N. ruficaudus (Red-tailed chipmunk); N. rufus (Hopi chipmunk); N. senex (Allen's chipmunk); N. siskiyou (Siskiyou chipmunk); N. sonomae (Sonoma chipmunk); N. speciosus (Lodgepole chipmunk); N. townsendii (Townsend's chipmunk); N. umbrinus (Uinta chipmunk)	North America	Size range: 10 cm (4 in) long, plus 6 cm (2 in) tail (alpine chipmunk) to 16 cm (6 in) long, plus 11 cm (4 in) tail (Durango chipmunk) Habitats: Rocky areas, forest, grassland, shrubland, and desert Diets: Fruit and seeds, as well as flowers, fungi, insects, and eggs
Notocitellus (tropical ground squirrel)	Howell, 1938 Two species: N. adocetus (Tropical ground squirrel, pictured); N. annulatus (Ring-tailed ground squirrel)	Mexico	Size range: 16 cm (6 in) long, plus 13 cm (5 in) tail (tropical ground squirrel) to 22 cm (9 in) long, plus 21 cm (8 in) tail (ring-tailed ground squirrel) Habitats: Shrubland, rocky areas, and forest Diets: Seeds, nuts, grains, roots, bulbs, fungi, vegetation, and insects, as well as small vertebrates and eggs
Otospermophilus (American rock squirrel)	Brandt, 1844 Two species: O. beecheyi (California ground squirrel, pictured); O. variegatus (Rock squirrel)	Mexico and western United States	Size range: 28 cm (11 in) long, plus 13 cm (5 in) tail (California ground squirrel) to 54 cm (21 in) long, plus 26 cm (10 in) tail (rock squirrel) Habitats: Shrubland, rocky areas, and grassland Diets: Seeds, nuts, grains, roots, bulbs, fungi, vegetation, and insects, as well as small vertebrates and eggs
Paraxerus (African bush squirrel)	Forsyth Major, 1893 Eleven species: P. alexandri (Alexander's bush squirrel); P. boehmi (Boehm's bush squirrel); P. cepapi (Smith's bush squirrel, pictured); P. cooperi (Cooper's mountain squirrel); P. flavovittis (Striped bush squirrel); P. lucifer (Black and red bush squirrel); P. ochraceus (Ochre bush squirrel); P. palliatus (Red bush squirrel); P. poensis (Green bush squirrel); P. vexillarius (Swynnerton's bush squirrel); P. vincenti (Vincent's bush squirrel)	Sub-Saharan Africa	Size range: 13 cm (5 in) long, plus 10 cm (4 in) tail (Alexander's bush squirrel) to 23 cm (9 in) long, plus 20 cm (8 in) tail (black and red bush squirrel) Habitats: Shrubland, savanna, and forest Diets: Seeds and fruit, as well as roots and eggs
Poliocitellus	Howell, 1938 One species: P. franklinii (Franklin's ground squirrel)	Central United States and southern Canada	Size: 23–24 cm (9 in) long, plus about 13 cm (5 in) tail Habitats: Savanna, grassland, and inland wetlands Diet: Seeds, nuts, grains, roots, bulbs, fungi, vegetation, and insects, as well as small vertebrates and eggs
Protoxerus (African giant squirrel)	Forsyth Major, 1893 Two species: P. aubinnii (Slender-tailed squirrel); P. stangeri (Forest giant squirrel, pictured)	Western and central Africa	Size range: 24 cm (9 in) long, plus 30 cm (12 in) tail (slender-tailed squirrel) to 30 cm (12 in) long, plus 31 cm (12 in) tail (forest giant squirrel) Habitats: Forest Diets: Seeds, nuts, and fruit
Sciurotamias (Chinese rock squirrel)	Miller, 1901 Two species: S. davidianus (Père David's rock squirrel, pictured); S. forresti (Forrest's rock squirrel)	China	Size range: 20 cm (8 in) long, plus 14 cm (6 in) tail (Père David's rock squirrel) to 22 cm (9 in) long, plus 16 cm (6 in) tail (Forrest's rock squirrel) Habitats: Shrubland and rocky areas Diets: Fruit and seeds
Spermophilopsis	Blasius, 1884 One species: S. leptodactylus (Long-clawed ground squirrel)	Central Asia	Size: 23–27 cm (9–11 in) long, plus 2–9 cm (1–4 in) tail Habitats: Desert, grassland, and shrubland Diet: Fruit, seeds, vegetation, and insects
Spermophilus (Holarctic ground squirrel)	F. Cuvier, 1825 Fifteen species: S. alaschanicus (Alashan ground squirrel); S. brevicauda (Brandt's ground squirrel); S. citellus (European ground squirrel); S. dauricus (Daurian ground squirrel); S. erythrogenys (Red-cheeked ground squirrel); S. fulvus (Yellow ground squirrel); S. major (Russet ground squirrel); S. musicus (Caucasian Mountain ground squirrel, pictured); S. nilkaensis (Tian Shan ground squirrel); S. pallidicauda (Pallid ground squirrel); S. pygmaeus (Little ground squirrel); S. relictus (Relict ground squirrel); S. suslicus (Speckled ground squirrel); S. taurensis (Taurus ground squirrel); S. xanthoprymnus (Asia Minor ground squirrel)	Asia and eastern Europe	Size range: 14 cm (6 in) long, plus 3 cm (1 in) tail (Asia Minor ground squirrel) to 32 cm (13 in) long, plus 11 cm (4 in) tail (Russet ground squirrel) Habitats: Rocky areas, grassland, shrubland, and desert Diets: Seeds, nuts, grains, roots, bulbs, fungi, vegetation, and insects, as well as small vertebrates and eggs
Tamias	Illiger, 1811 One species: T. striatus (Eastern chipmunk)	Eastern United States and eastern Canada	Size: 14–15 cm (6 in) long, plus 8–10 cm (3–4 in) tail Habitats: Shrubland and forest Diet: Nuts, seeds, fruit, and fungi
Urocitellus (ground squirrel)	Obolenskij, 1927 Twelve species: U. armatus (Uinta ground squirrel); U. beldingi (Belding's ground squirrel, pictured); U. brunneus (Northern Idaho ground squirrel); U. canus (Merriam's ground squirrel); U. columbianus (Columbian ground squirrel); U. elegans (Wyoming ground squirrel); U. mollis (Piute ground squirrel); U. parryii (Arctic ground squirrel); U. richardsonii (Richardson's ground squirrel); U. townsendii (Townsend's ground squirrel); U. undulatus (Long-tailed ground squirrel); U. washingtoni (Washington ground squirrel)	Canada, United States, and central and eastern Asia	Size range: 15 cm (6 in) long, plus 3 cm (1 in) tail (Merriam's ground squirrel) to 34 cm (13 in) long, plus 9 cm (4 in) tail (Richardson's ground squirrel) Habitats: Shrubland, grassland, desert, and forest Diets: Seeds, nuts, grains, roots, bulbs, fungi, vegetation, and insects, as well as small vertebrates and eggs
Xerospermophilus (desert ground squirrel)	Merriam, 1892 Four species: X. mohavensis (Mohave ground squirrel); X. perotensis (Perote ground squirrel); X. spilosoma (Spotted ground squirrel); X. tereticaudus (Round-tailed ground squirrel, pictured)	Mexico and United States	Size range: 18 cm (7 in) long, plus 5 cm (2 in) tail (spotted ground squirrel) to 28 cm (11 in) long, plus 12 cm (5 in) tail (round-tailed ground squirrel) Habitats: Grassland, desert, and forest Diets: Seeds, nuts, grains, roots, bulbs, fungi, vegetation, and insects, as well as small vertebrates and eggs
Xerus (unstriped ground squirrel)	Hemprich & Ehrenberg, 1833 Four species: X. erythropus (African striped ground squirrel, pictured); X. inauris (Cape ground squirrel); X. princeps (Mountain ground squirrel); X. rutilus (Unstriped ground squirrel)	Sub-Saharan Africa	Size range: 22–29 cm (9–11 in) long, plus 18–26 cm (7–10 in) tail (African striped ground squirrel) Habitats: Shrubland, desert, savanna, and forest Diets: Roots, seeds, fruit, grains, insects, small vertebrates, and eggs

== Sources ==
- Barthelmess, Erika L. (2016). Wilson, D. E.; Lacher, T. E.; Mittermeier, R. A. (eds.). Handbook of the Mammals of the World. Vol. 6. Lagomorphs and Rodents I. Lynx Nature Books. ISBN 978-84-941892-3-4.
- Chernasky, Amy; Motis, Anna; Burgin, Connor, eds. (2023). All the Mammals of the World. Lynx Nature Books. ISBN 978-84-16728-66-4.
- Nowak, Ronald M. (1999). Walker's Mammals of the World. Vol. 2 (6th ed.). Johns Hopkins University Press. ISBN 978-0-8018-5789-8.
- Musser, Guy G.; Carleton, Michael D. (2005). Wilson, Don E.; Reeder, DeeAnn M. (eds.). Mammal Species of the World. Vol. 2 (3rd ed.). Johns Hopkins University Press. ISBN 978-0-8018-8221-0.
