= List of glirids =

Species in mammal family Gliridae

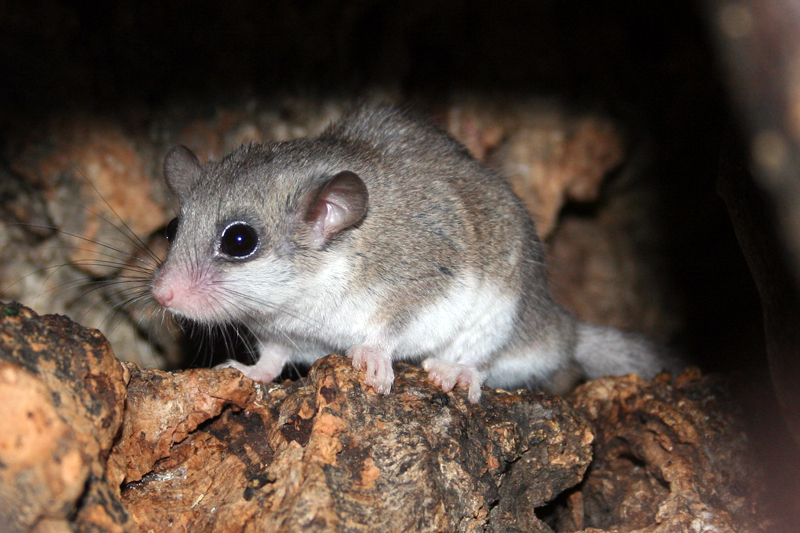
African dormouse, Graphiurus sp.

Gliridae is a family of small mammals in the order Rodentia and part of the Sciuromorpha suborder. Members of this family are called glirids or dormice. They are found in Europe, Africa, and Asia, primarily in forests, savannas, and shrublands, though some species can be found in wetlands, deserts, or rocky areas. They range in size from Setzer's mouse-tailed dormouse, at 6 cm (2 in) plus a 6 cm (2 in) tail, to the European edible dormouse, at 19 cm (7 in) plus an 18 cm (7 in) tail. Glirids are omnivores and feed on fruit and nuts, as well as invertebrates, birds and their eggs, and small rodents. The desert dormouse feeds primarily on insects and spiders. No glirids have population estimates, though none are categorized as endangered species or critically endangered.

The twenty-nine extant species of Gliridae are divided into three subfamilies: Glirinae, containing two species in two genera; Graphiurinae, containing a single genus of fifteen species; and Leithiinae, containing twelve species in six genera. A few extinct prehistoric glirid species have been discovered, though due to ongoing research and discoveries, the exact number and categorization is not fixed.

== Conventions ==
IUCN Red List categories
Conservation status
- EX: Extinct (0 species)
- EW: Extinct in the wild (0 species)
- CR: Critically endangered (0 species)
- EN: Endangered (0 species)
- VU: Vulnerable (3 species)
- NT: Near threatened (0 species)
- LC: Least concern (15 species)

Other categories
- DD: Data deficient (11 species)
- NE: Not evaluated (0 species)

The author citation for the species or genus is given after the scientific name; parentheses around the author citation indicate that this was not the original taxonomic placement. Conservation status codes listed follow the International Union for Conservation of Nature (IUCN) Red List of Threatened Species. Range maps are provided wherever possible; if a range map is not available, a description of the glirid's range is provided. Ranges are based on the IUCN Red List for that species unless otherwise noted.

== Classification ==
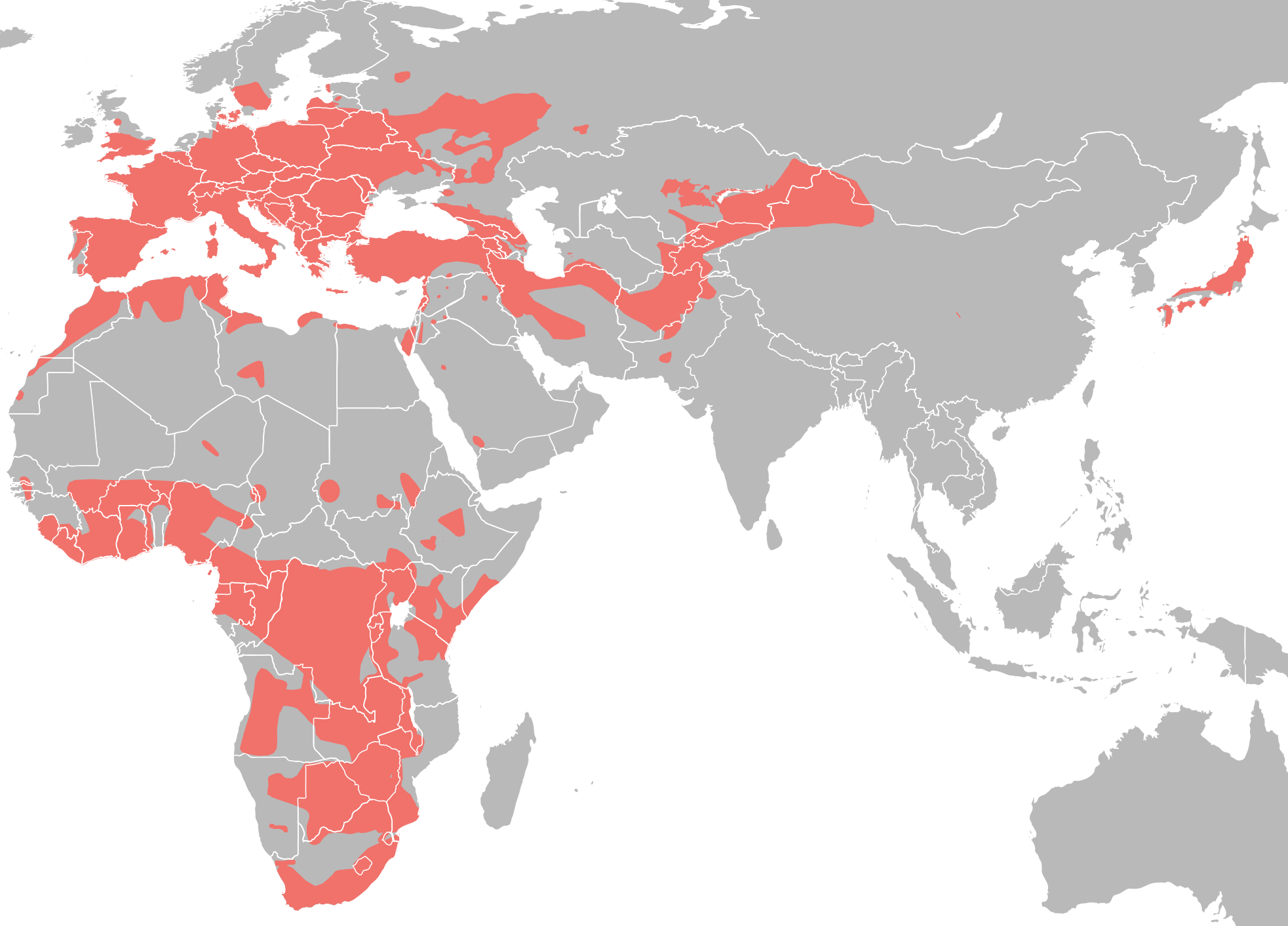
Gliridae distribution

Gliridae is a family consisting of twenty-nine extant species in nine genera. These genera are divided between three subfamilies: Glirinae, Graphiurinae, and Leithiinae.

Family Gliridae

- Subfamily Glirinae
  - Genus Glirulus (Japanese dormouse): one species
  - Genus Glis (European edible dormouse): one species
- Subfamily Graphiurinae
  - Genus Graphiurus (African dormice): fifteen species
- Subfamily Leithiinae
  - Genus Chaetocauda (Chinese dormouse): one species
  - Genus Dryomys (forest dormice): three species
  - Genus Eliomys (garden dormice): three species
  - Genus Muscardinus (hazel dormouse): one species
  - Genus Myomimus (mouse-tailed dormice): three species
  - Genus Selevinia (desert dormouse): one species

- Gliridae
  - - Graphiurinae
      Graphiurus
    - Glirinae
      - Glirulus
      - Glis
  - - Leithiinae
      - Chaetocauda
      - Muscardinus
      - - - Myomimus
          - Selevinia
        - - Dryomys
          - Eliomys

== Glirids ==
The following classification is based on the taxonomy described by the reference work Mammal Species of the World (2005), with augmentation by generally accepted proposals made since using molecular phylogenetic analysis, as supported by both the IUCN and the American Society of Mammalogists.

=== Subfamily Glirinae ===
Genus Glirulus – Thomas, 1906 – one species
Common name	Scientific name and subspecies	Range	Size and ecology	IUCN status and estimated population
Japanese dormouse	G. japonicus (Schinz, 1845)	Japan	Size: 6–10 cm (2–4 in) long, plus 3–6 cm (1–2 in) tail Habitat: Forest	LC Unknown

Genus Glis – Brisson, 1762 – one species
Common name	Scientific name and subspecies	Range	Size and ecology	IUCN status and estimated population
European edible dormouse	G. glis (Linnaeus, 1766)	Europe and western Asia	Size: 13–19 cm (5–7 in) long, plus 10–18 cm (4–7 in) tail Habitat: Forest and shrubland	LC Unknown

=== Subfamily Graphiurinae ===
Genus Graphiurus – Smuts, 1832 – fifteen species
Common name	Scientific name and subspecies	Range	Size and ecology	IUCN status and estimated population
Angolan African dormouse	G. angolensis De Winton, 1897	Angola and Zambia	Size: 7–12 cm (3–5 in) long, plus 7–10 cm (3–4 in) tail Habitat: Forest	DD Unknown
Christy's dormouse	G. christyi Dollman, 1914	Central Africa	Size: 8–11 cm (3–4 in) long, plus 7–10 cm (3–4 in) tail Habitat: Forest	LC Unknown
Jentink's dormouse	G. crassicaudatus (Jentink, 1888)	Western Africa	Size: 8–10 cm (3–4 in) long, plus 5–7 cm (2–3 in) tail Habitat: Forest	DD Unknown
Johnston's African dormouse	G. johnstoni Thomas, 1898	Malawi	Size: 6–9 cm (2–4 in) long, plus 6–8 cm (2–3 in) tail Habitat: Savanna	DD Unknown
Kellen's dormouse	G. kelleni (Reuvens, 1890)	Scattered Sub-Saharan Africa	Size: 7–10 cm (3–4 in) long, plus 5–9 cm (2–4 in) tail Habitat: Savanna and forest	LC Unknown
Lorrain dormouse	G. lorraineus Dollman, 1910	Western and central Africa	Size: 7–10 cm (3–4 in) long, plus 5–8 cm (2–3 in) tail Habitat: Savanna and forest	LC Unknown
Monard's dormouse	G. monardi (St. Leger, 1936)	South-central Africa	Size: About 16 cm (6 in) long, plus about 13 cm (5 in) tail Habitat: Savanna	DD Unknown
Nagtglas's African dormouse	G. nagtglasii Jentink, 1888	Western Africa	Size: 12–16 cm (5–6 in) long, plus 6–13 cm (2–5 in) tail Habitat: Forest	LC Unknown
Rock dormouse	G. platyops Thomas, 1897	Southern Africa	Size: 9–13 cm (4–5 in) long, plus 6–10 cm (2–4 in) tail Habitat: Forest and rocky areas	LC Unknown
Silent dormouse	G. surdus Dollman, 1912	Western Africa	Size: 8–11 cm (3–4 in) long, plus 6–9 cm (2–4 in) tail Habitat: Forest	DD Unknown
Small-eared dormouse	G. microtis (Noack, 1887)	Scattered Sub-Saharan Africa	Size: 7–12 cm (3–5 in) long, plus 6–9 cm (2–4 in) tail Habitat: Forest, savanna, and shrubland	LC Unknown
Spectacled dormouse	G. ocularis (Smith, 1829)	South Africa	Size: 11–15 cm (4–6 in) long, plus 10–15 cm (4–6 in) tail Habitat: Shrubland and rocky areas	LC Unknown
Stone dormouse	G. rupicola (Thomas & Hinton, 1925)	Namibia and South Africa	Size: 10–12 cm (4–5 in) long, plus 9–12 cm (4–5 in) tail Habitat: Rocky areas	LC Unknown
Walter Verheyen's African dormouse	G. walterverheyeni Holden & Levine, 2009	Democratic Republic of the Congo	Size: About 7 cm (3 in) long, plus about 6 cm (2 in) tail Habitat: Forest	DD Unknown
Woodland dormouse	G. murinus (Desmarest, 1822)	Eastern and southern Africa	Size: 8–12 cm (3–5 in) long, plus 7–9 cm (3–4 in) tail Habitat: Inland wetlands, grassland, shrubland, savanna, and forest	LC Unknown

=== Subfamily Leithiinae ===
Genus Chaetocauda – Wang, 1985 – one species
Common name	Scientific name and subspecies	Range	Size and ecology	IUCN status and estimated population
Chinese dormouse	C. sichuanensis Wang, 1985	Central China	Size: 9–10 cm (4–4 in) long, plus 9–11 cm (4–4 in) tail Habitat: Forest	DD Unknown

Genus Dryomys – Thomas, 1905 – three species
Common name	Scientific name and subspecies	Range	Size and ecology	IUCN status and estimated population
Balochistan forest dormouse	D. niethammeri Holden, 1996	Central Pakistan	Size: 9–11 cm (4–4 in) long, plus about 9 cm (4 in) tail Habitat: Forest	VU Unknown
Forest dormouse	D. nitedula (Pallas, 1778)	Eastern Europe and western and central Asia	Size: 7–11 cm (3–4 in) long, plus 6–11 cm (2–4 in) tail Habitat: Forest, shrubland, and rocky areas	LC Unknown
Woolly dormouse	D. laniger Felten & Storch, 1968	Turkey	Size: 8–10 cm (3–4 in) long, plus 4–8 cm (2–3 in) tail Habitat: Rocky areas	DD Unknown

Genus Eliomys – Wagner, 1840 – three species
Common name	Scientific name and subspecies	Range	Size and ecology	IUCN status and estimated population
Asian garden dormouse	E. melanurus (Wagner, 1839)	Northern Africa and western Asia	Size: 11–15 cm (4–6 in) long, plus 10–14 cm (4–6 in) tail Habitat: Forest, shrubland, and rocky areas	LC Unknown
Garden dormouse	E. quercinus (Linnaeus, 1766)	Europe and western Asia	Size: 9–12 cm (4–5 in) long, plus 8–11 cm (3–4 in) tail Habitat: Forest and rocky areas	VU Unknown
Maghreb garden dormouse	E. munbyanus (Pomel, 1856)	Northern Africa	Size: 10–14 cm (4–6 in) long, plus 9–12 cm (4–5 in) tail Habitat: Coastal marine, desert, rocky areas, shrubland, and forest	LC Unknown

Genus Muscardinus – Kaup, 1829 – one species
Common name	Scientific name and subspecies	Range	Size and ecology	IUCN status and estimated population
Hazel dormouse	M. avellanarius (Linnaeus, 1758)	Europe and western Asia	Size: 6–10 cm (2–4 in) long, plus 5–9 cm (2–4 in) tail Habitat: Forest	LC Unknown

Genus Myomimus – Ogniov, 1924 – three species
Common name	Scientific name and subspecies	Range	Size and ecology	IUCN status and estimated population
Masked mouse-tailed dormouse	M. personatus Ogniov, 1924	West-central Asia	Size: 7–8 cm (3–3 in) long, plus 5–7 cm (2–3 in) tail Habitat: Shrubland	DD Unknown
Roach's mouse-tailed dormouse	M. roachi (Bate, 1937)	Southeastern Europe and Turkey	Size: 8–14 cm (3–6 in) long, plus 6–10 cm (2–4 in) tail Habitat: Shrubland and unknown	VU Unknown
Setzer's mouse-tailed dormouse	M. setzeri Rossolimo, 1976	Western Asia	Size: 6–9 cm (2–4 in) long, plus 6–7 cm (2–3 in) tail Habitat: Forest and savanna	DD Unknown

Genus Selevinia – Belosludov & Bazhanov, 1939 – one species
Common name	Scientific name and subspecies	Range	Size and ecology	IUCN status and estimated population
Desert dormouse	S. betpakdalaensis Belosludov & Bazhanov, 1939	Kazakhstan	Size: 7–10 cm (3–4 in) long, plus 5–8 cm (2–3 in) tail Habitat: Desert	DD Unknown

== Sources ==
- Chernasky, Amy; Motis, Anna; Burgin, Connor, eds. (2023). All the Mammals of the World. Lynx Nature Books. ISBN 978-84-16728-66-4.
- Holden, Mary Ellen (2005). Wilson, Don E.; Reeder, DeeAnn M. (eds.). Mammal Species of the World. Vol. 2 (3rd ed.). Johns Hopkins University Press. ISBN 978-0-8018-8221-0.
