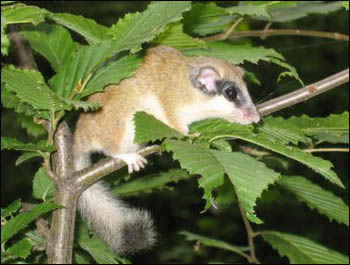
- Dryomys nitedula

Scientific classification
- Kingdom: Animalia
- Phylum: Chordata
- Class: Mammalia
- Infraclass: Placentalia
- Order: Rodentia
- Family: Gliridae
- Subfamily: Leithiinae; Lydekker, 1896

Genera
- Chaetocauda; Dryomys; Eliomys †Hypnomys †Leithia; Muscardinus; Myomimus; Selevinia

= Leithiinae =

Subfamily of rodents

Leithiinae is a subfamily of dormice. It is named after the Leithia, an extinct genus of giant dormouse from the Pleistocene of Sicily.

== Classification ==
Subfamily Leithiinae

- Genus Chaetocauda
  - Chinese dormouse, Chaetocauda sichuanensis
- Genus Dryomys
  - Woolly dormouse, Dryomys laniger
  - Balochistan forest dormouse, Dryomys niethammeri
  - Forest dormouse, Dryomys nitedula
- Genus Eliomys, garden dormice
  - Asian garden dormouse, Eliomys melanurus
  - Maghreb garden dormouse, Eliomys munbyanus
  - Garden dormouse, Eliomys quercinus
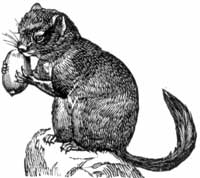
- Genus Hypnomys† (Balearic dormouse)
  - Hypnomys morphaeus†
  - Hypnomys mahonensis†
- Genus Leithia†
- Genus Muscardinus
  - Hazel dormouse, Muscardinus avellanarius
- Genus Myomimus, mouse-tailed dormice
  - Masked mouse-tailed dormouse, Myomimus personatus
  - Roach's mouse-tailed dormouse, Myomimus roachi
  - Setzer's mouse-tailed dormouse, Myomimus setzeri
- Genus Selevinia
  - Desert dormouse, Selevinia betpakdalaensis

=== Phylogeny ===
Cladogram of dormice after Petrova et al. 2024:

- Gliridae (dormice)
  - - Graphiurinae
      Graphiurus (African dormice)
    - Glirinae
      - Glirulus (Japanese dormouse)
      - Glis (edible dormice)
  - Leithiinae
    - Muscardinus (hazel dormouse)
    - - - Myomimus (mouse-tailed dormice)
        - Selevinia (desert dormouse)
      - - Dryomys (woolly and forest dormice)
        - - Eliomys (garden dormice)
          - †Hypnomys (Balearic dormice)
