= Walter Verheyen's African dormouse =

Conservation status
- Data Deficient (IUCN 3.1)

Scientific classification
- Domain: Eukaryota
- Kingdom: Animalia
- Phylum: Chordata
- Class: Mammalia
- Order: Rodentia
- Family: Gliridae
- Genus: Graphiurus
- Species: G. walterverheyeni

Binomial name
- Graphiurus walterverheyeni Holden & Levine, 2009
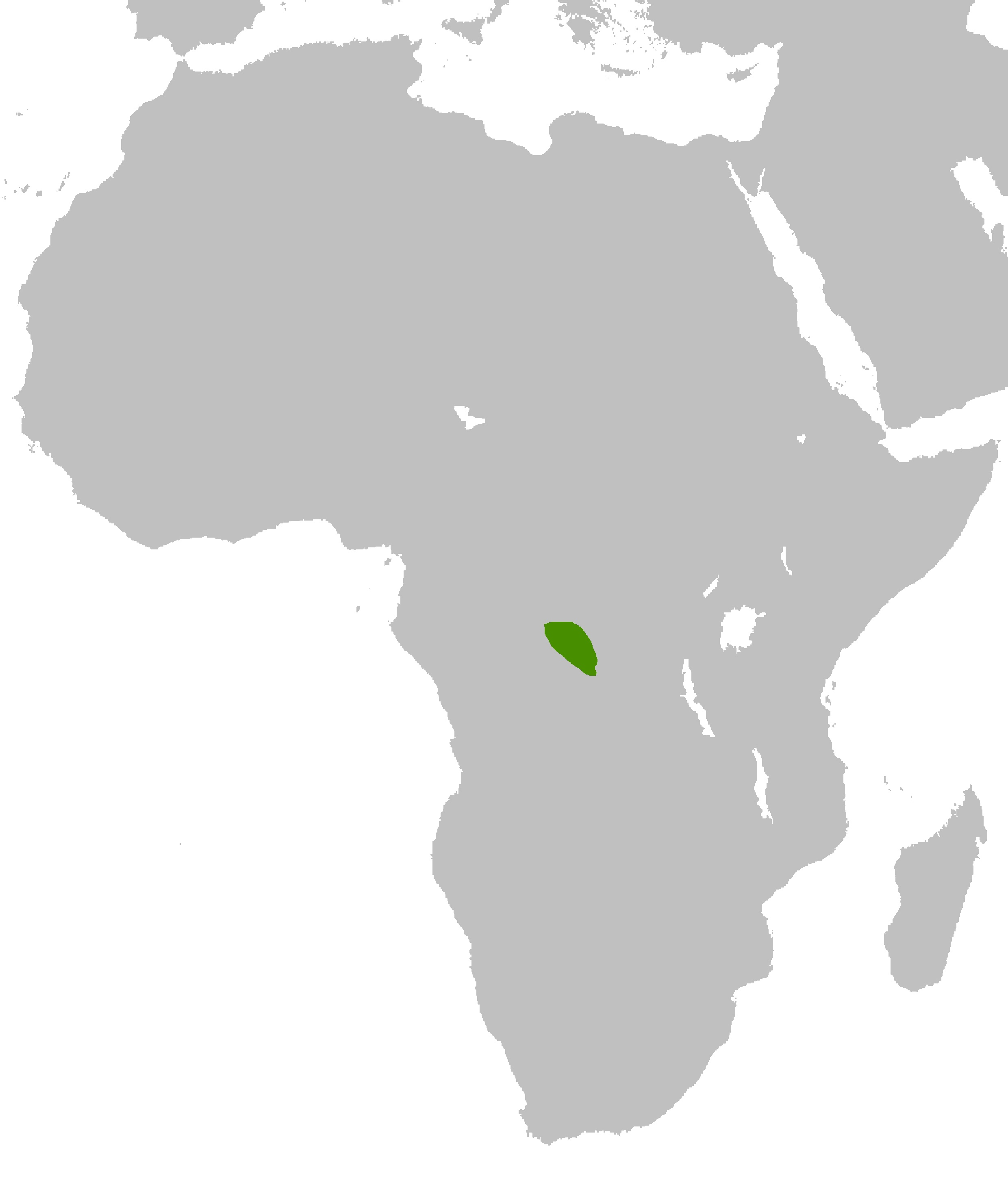

Species of rodent

Walter Verheyen's African dormouse (Graphiurus walterverheyeni) is a monotypic species of rodent in the family Gliridae. From the Central Congolian lowland forests ecoregion in the central Congo Basin, it has been found in west-central Democratic Republic of the Congo, in the vicinity of the Lukenie River and of Wafania, near the left bank of the Luilaka River. Although not found in immediate association, Lorraine's dormouse (Graphiurus lorraineus) and the short-eared African dormouse (Graphiurus surdus) are understood to be "broadly sympatric". Most closely resembling Jentink's dormouse (Graphiurus crassicaudatus), it differs from this species both in its much smaller size and in its relative proportions. On the IUCN Red List, its conservation status has been assessed as Data Deficient.

== See also ==
- Walter Verheyen's mouse
- Walter's duiker
- Lomami River
- Lualaba River
- Sankuru Nature Reserve
