= Angolan African dormouse =

Conservation status
- Data Deficient (IUCN 3.1)

Scientific classification
- Kingdom: Animalia
- Phylum: Chordata
- Class: Mammalia
- Order: Rodentia
- Family: Gliridae
- Genus: Graphiurus
- Species: G. angolensis

Binomial name
- Graphiurus angolensis de Winton, 1897
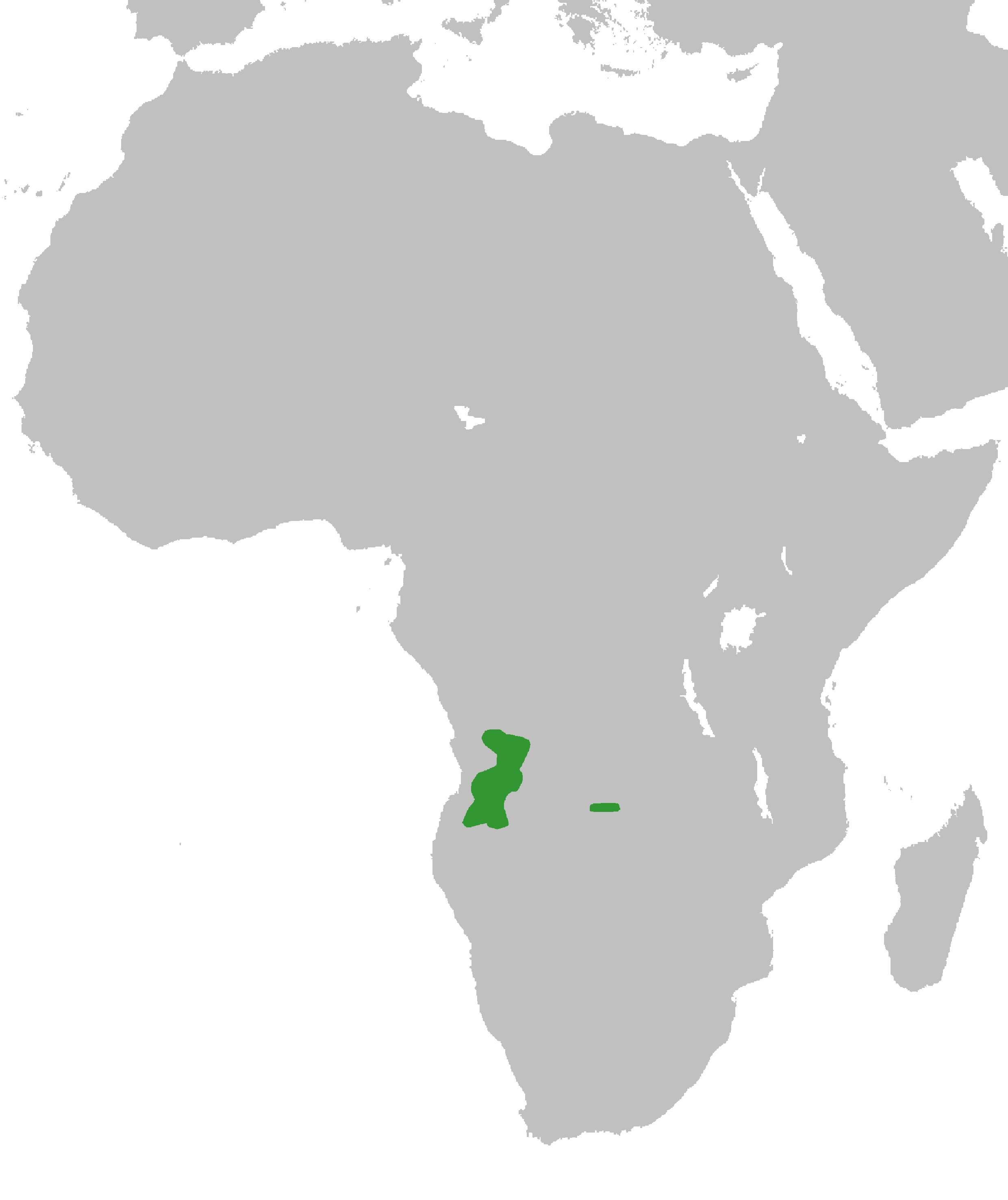

Species of rodent

The Angolan African dormouse (Graphiurus angolensis) is a species of rodent in the family Gliridae. Found in central and north Angola and western Zambia, it has been recorded from seven localities over an altitudinal range from 1,000 to 2,000 m (3,300 to 6,600 ft) above sea level. Its natural habitat is tropical dry forests. Although the population size is unknown, it is thought to be generally uncommon.

== Description ==
A small species, this dormouse has a head-and-body length of 80 to 110 mm (3.1 to 4.3 in) and a tail of 70 to 96 mm (2.8 to 3.8 in). The fur on the back is soft, smooth and rather long. The dorsal colour varies, ranging from golden brown, rusty brown or drab brown to dark brown, the ridge of the back often being darker than the rest. The underparts are white or cream, slightly tinted with grey, and there is a sharp line demarcating the junction between the dorsal and ventral colouring. The ears are large, brown and rounded and the eyes are large. There is a conspicuous mask round the eyes and the cheeks are white or cream, this colour extending in a band to the shoulders. The tail has short fur near the base and long hair near the tip. It is basically the same colour as the dorsal fur but some white hairs are mixed with the darker ones and the tip is white. This species is similar in appearance and skull characteristics to the rock dormouse (Graphiurus platyops) but their distributions do not overlap. The stone dormouse (Graphiurus rupicola) is larger and not found in miombo woodland, and the small-eared dormouse (Graphiurus microtis) is smaller and the ranges of the two species only overlap in Zambia.

== Distribution and habitat ==
The known species range includes only northern and central Angola and western Zambia, at altitudes between about 1,000 and 2,000 m (3,300 and 6,600 ft). It has only been recorded from seven locations and is likely an uncommon species, its typical habitat being tropical dry woodland, and wooded savannah. In miombo woodland it tends to occur in the vicinity of water.

== Ecology ==
The Angolan African dormouse has been little studied but it is thought to be mainly nocturnal and arboreal. Most of the individuals encountered have been in trees, but specimens have been found in the roof of a hut, in various buildings and in an old beehive. The diet is likely to be omnivorous and to include insect grubs and fruit. Females have sometimes been caught accompanied by up to four young.

== Status ==
G. angolensis has been assessed as "data deficient" by the International Union for Conservation of Nature because of its dubious taxonomic status, the lack of knowledge as to the extent of its occurrence and its conservation status, and the lack of information on its life cycle and the threats it faces.
