= Myomimus maritsensis =

Myomimus maritsensis Temporal range: Late Miocene

Scientific classification
- Kingdom: Animalia
- Phylum: Chordata
- Class: Mammalia
- Order: Rodentia
- Family: Gliridae
- Genus: Myomimus
- Species: †M. maritsensis

Binomial name
- †Myomimus maritsensis De Brujin et al., 1970

Myomimus maritsensis is an extinct species of glirid rodent that lived in Anatolia during the Late Miocene subepoch.

== Palaeoecology ==
The dental microwear patterns of M. maritsensis from the Late Miocene site of Hayranlı in central eastern Anatolia reveal that it was a dietary generalist that consumed fruits, seeds, grasses, and insects.
