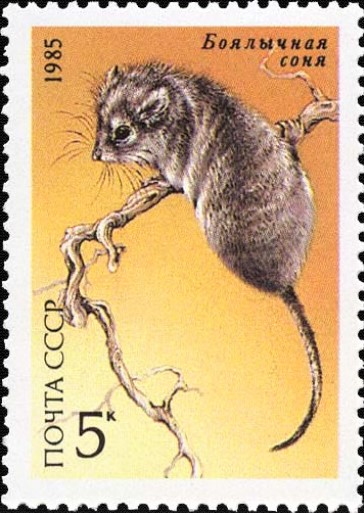

Conservation status
- Data Deficient (IUCN 3.1)

Scientific classification
- Kingdom: Animalia
- Phylum: Chordata
- Class: Mammalia
- Infraclass: Placentalia
- Order: Rodentia
- Family: Gliridae
- Subfamily: Leithiinae
- Genus: Selevinia; Belosludov & Bazhanov, 1939
- Species: S. betpakdalaensis

Binomial name
- Selevinia betpakdalaensis Belosludov & Bazhanov, 1939

= Desert dormouse =

Species of rodent

The desert dormouse (Selevinia betpakdalaensis) is a species of rodent in the dormouse family, Gliridae. This species was formerly placed in its own family, Seleviniidae, but it is now considered to be a dormouse, monotypic within the genus Selevinia. It is endemic to Kazakhstan.

== Taxonomy ==
The desert dormouse was first described in 1939 by Belosludov & Bazhanov as Selevinia betpakdalaensis, the specific name being derived from the Betpak-Dala Desert, west of Lake Balkhash in Kazakhstan, where the type specimen was found. They included it in the rat and mouse family Muridae but later proposed placing it in a new family allied to the dormice (Myoxidae or Gliridae). By 1947, they had concluded that it should be placed in the dormouse subfamily Leithiinae.

Relationship of the desert dormouse to other dormice based on mitochondrial DNA after Petrova et al. 2024:

- Gliridae (dormice)
  - - Graphiurinae
      Graphiurus (African dormice)
    - Glirinae
      - Glirulus (Japanese dormouse)
      - Glis (edible dormice)
  - Leithiinae
    - Muscardinus (hazel dormouse)
    - - - Myomimus (mouse-tailed dormice)
        - Selevinia (desert dormouse)
      - - Dryomys (woolly and forest dormice)
        - - Eliomys (garden dormice)
          - †Hypnomys (Balearic dormice)

== Description ==
This dormouse has a head-and-body length of between 75 and 95 mm (3.0 and 3.7 in) and a tail of between 58 and 77 mm (2.3 and 3.0 in). It has a robust, rounded body and soft dense fur, the upper parts being grey and the underparts white. Unusually for a mammal, it sheds the upper layers of its skin with the hairs when it moults, starting at the back of the neck and continuing along the body and flanks, the whole process taking about a month. The tail is well clad with short hairs and the soles of the feet are naked. The upper incisors are large but the cheek teeth are small and barely project through the gums.

== Ecology ==
The species lives in sandy or clayey soils in arid habitats. It is mainly a nocturnal animal but does sometimes venture into the open during the day. It mostly walks along in a leisurely fashion but if alarmed, can move faster in a series of short bounds. It lives among desert shrubs such as Artemisia maritima and Salsola laricifolia and can climb efficiently. These animals have been little studied in the wild, but in captivity may shelter under rocks and foliage when the weather is warm and only burrow underground during cold periods. It mostly feeds on insects and spiders, but has been known to consume vegetation. It hibernates during the coldest months of the year, only being active between about March and September. Pregnant and lactating females have been found in late May and June, with litter sizes of four to eight young being recorded.

== Distribution and status ==
S. betpakdalaensis has a large range in southern and eastern Kazakhstan but is not abundant, being known from only about forty individuals scattered over about thirty locations, many in the deserts around Lake Balkhash. The total population and its trend are unknown and it may be threatened by the loss of the desert shrubs among which it lives. Because of these uncertainties, the International Union for Conservation of Nature has assessed its conservation status as "data deficient".
