= Eogliravus =

Eogliravus Temporal range: Early to Middle Eocene

Scientific classification
- Kingdom: Animalia
- Phylum: Chordata
- Class: Mammalia
- Order: Rodentia
- Family: Gliridae
- Subfamily: †Gliravinae
- Genus: †Eogliravus; Hartenberger, 1971

Species
- Eogliravus hammeli Thaler, 1966; Eogliravus moltzeri Peláez-Campomanes, 1995; Eogliravus wildi Hartenberger, 1971

Extinct genus of rodents

Eogliravus is an extinct genus containing the earliest known fossil dormouse.

Originally described from a few scattered teeth, a complete skeleton of E.wildi was later uncovered from the Messel Formation. This was remarkably well preserved, including some soft body parts, with the outline of individual hairs from its coat and bushy tail being visible. The animal measured approximately 11 cm (4.3 in) from the nose to the tip of the tail. The shape and proportion of the limb bones suggest that it would have been a skilled climber and likely arboreal. The gut included remains of seeds and softer plant matter. The eye sockets were relatively large, suggesting a nocturnal or crepuscular lifestyle.
