= Christy's dormouse =

Conservation status
- Least Concern (IUCN 3.1)

Scientific classification
- Kingdom: Animalia
- Phylum: Chordata
- Class: Mammalia
- Infraclass: Placentalia
- Order: Rodentia
- Family: Gliridae
- Genus: Graphiurus
- Species: G. christyi

Binomial name
- Graphiurus christyi Dollman, 1914
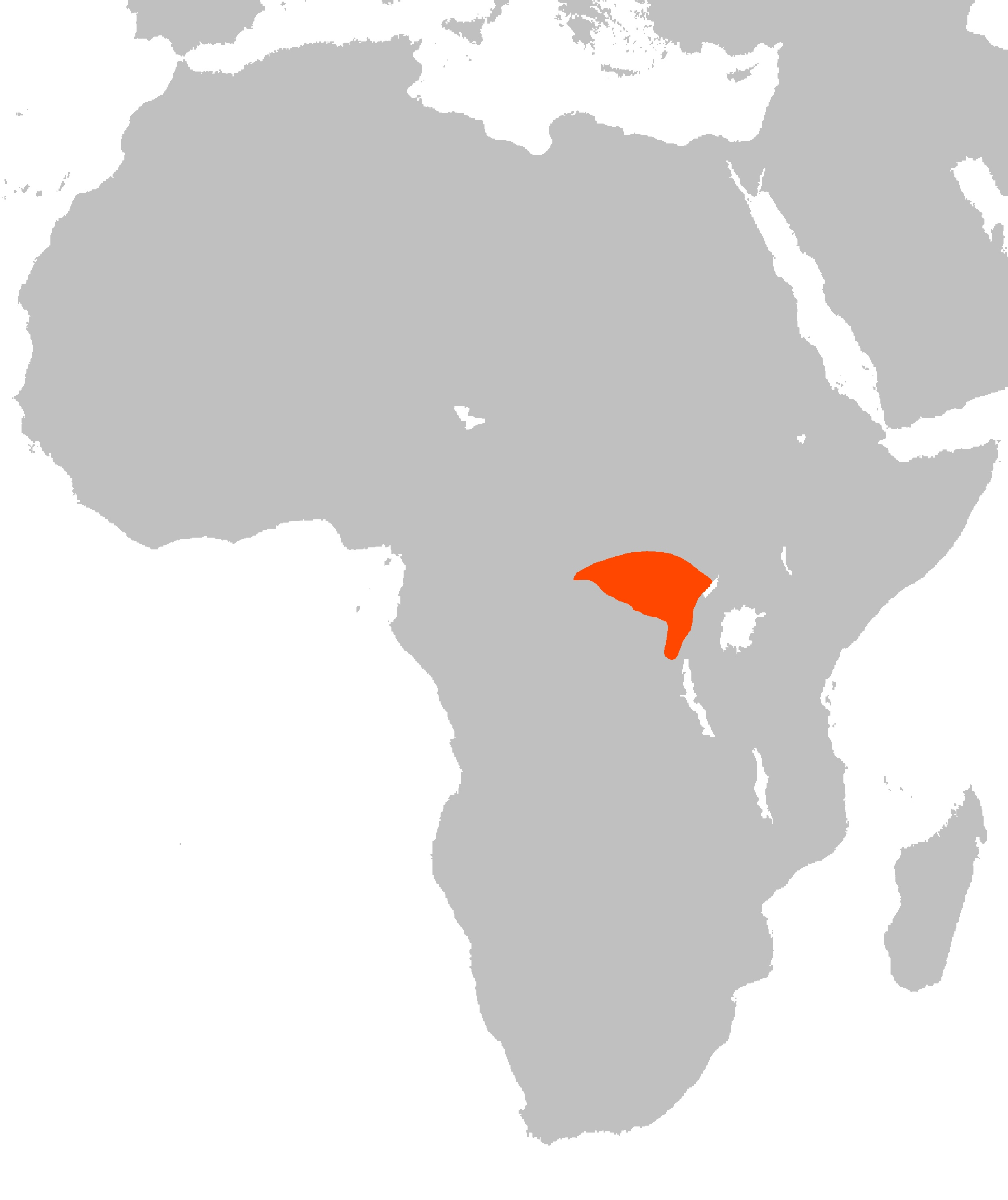

Species of rodent

Christy's dormouse (Graphiurus christyi) is a species of rodent in the family Gliridae. It is found in Cameroon and Democratic Republic of the Congo. Its natural habitat is subtropical or tropical moist lowland forests.

== Etymology ==
The dormouse Graphiurus christyi was named after Cuthbert Christy.
