= Kellen's dormouse =

Conservation status
- Least Concern (IUCN 3.1)

Scientific classification
- Kingdom: Animalia
- Phylum: Chordata
- Class: Mammalia
- Order: Rodentia
- Family: Gliridae
- Genus: Graphiurus
- Species: G. kelleni

Binomial name
- Graphiurus kelleni (Reuvens, 1890)
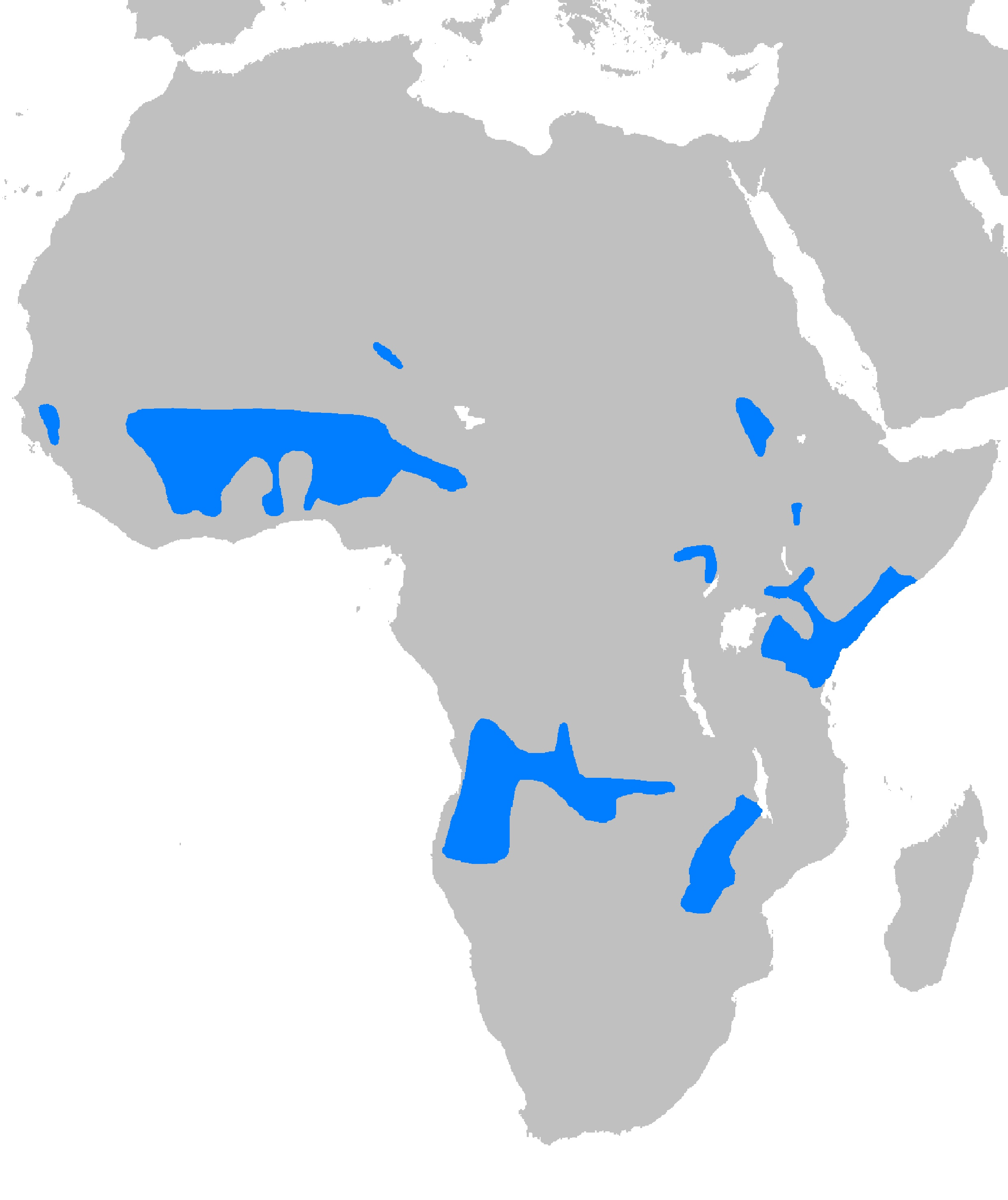

Synonyms
- Graphiurus olga (Thomas, 1925); Graphiurus parvus (True, 1893)

Species of rodent

Kellen's dormouse (Graphiurus kelleni) is a species of rodent in the family Gliridae. It is native to tropical Africa where its range extends from the Gambia and Senegal to Kenya and Tanzania. Its natural habitats are subtropical or tropical dry forests, and moist or dry savannah.

== Description ==
Kellen's dormouse has a head-and-body length of between 75 and 150 mm (3.0 and 5.9 in) and a bushy tail of 50 to 110 mm (2 to 4 in). The upper parts are grey, brown or tawny, the underparts are pale and the head has large ears and a dark mask surrounding the eyes.

== Distribution and habitat ==
Kellen's dormouse is native to tropical western, central and eastern Africa south of the Sahara Desert. It is found in Angola, Benin, Burkina Faso, Cameroon, Democratic Republic of the Congo, Ethiopia, Gambia, Ghana, Kenya, Malawi, Mali, Mozambique, Niger, Nigeria, Senegal, Somalia, South Sudan, Sudan, Tanzania, Togo, Uganda, Zambia and Zimbabwe. It occupies a range of habitats including dry forests and both moist and dry savannah.

== Ecology ==
Kellen's dormouse is an active animal, scrambling about in trees and pouncing on its living prey, which includes insects and other invertebrates, small vertebrates, birds' eggs and carrion. Its diet also includes seeds and fruit. It is nocturnal and builds a nest into which it retreats during the day. Apart from briefly in the breeding season, it is a mostly solitary animal. It makes a number of shrill vocalisations, including both warning signals and communication signals, but little is known of its behaviour.

== Status ==
Kellen's dormouse is a common species known from a range of habitat types. It has a very wide range and no specific threats have been identified, so the International Union for Conservation of Nature has rated its conservation status as being of "least concern".
