= Chinese dormouse =

Conservation status
- Data Deficient (IUCN 3.1)

Scientific classification
- Kingdom: Animalia
- Phylum: Chordata
- Class: Mammalia
- Order: Rodentia
- Family: Gliridae
- Subfamily: Leithiinae
- Genus: Chaetocauda; Wang, 1985
- Species: C. sichuanensis

Binomial name
- Chaetocauda sichuanensis Wang, 1985

Species of rodent

The Chinese dormouse or Sichuan dormouse (Chaetocauda sichuanensis) is a species of dormouse found in subalpine mixed forests in northern Sichuan, China, where it is known from Jiuzhaigou and Wanglang Nature Reserves. It is known only from two captured female specimens taken in the Wanglang Natural Reserve, and was first described by Wang Youzhi in 1985 and relisted by Corbet and Hill (1991, 1992) under a new genus as Chaetocauda sichuanensis. It is currently the only member of the genus Chaetocauda. The two specimens had head and body lengths of 90 millimetres (3.5 in) and 91 millimetres (3.6 in) and tail lengths of 92 millimetres (3.6 in) and 102 millimetres (4.0 in), respectively. They weighed 24.5 grams (0.86 oz) and 36.0 grams (1.27 oz), respectively. The species is nocturnal and arboreal, nesting in trees around 3 metres (9.8 ft) above the ground, and was found above an altitude of 2,500 metres (8,200 ft) above sea level. It is classified as endangered by the IUCN as of the 2004 Red List due to its small, isolated habitat.
