= Johnston's African dormouse =

Conservation status
- Data Deficient (IUCN 3.1)

Scientific classification
- Domain: Eukaryota
- Kingdom: Animalia
- Phylum: Chordata
- Class: Mammalia
- Order: Rodentia
- Family: Gliridae
- Genus: Graphiurus
- Species: G. johnstoni

Binomial name
- Graphiurus johnstoni Thomas, 1898
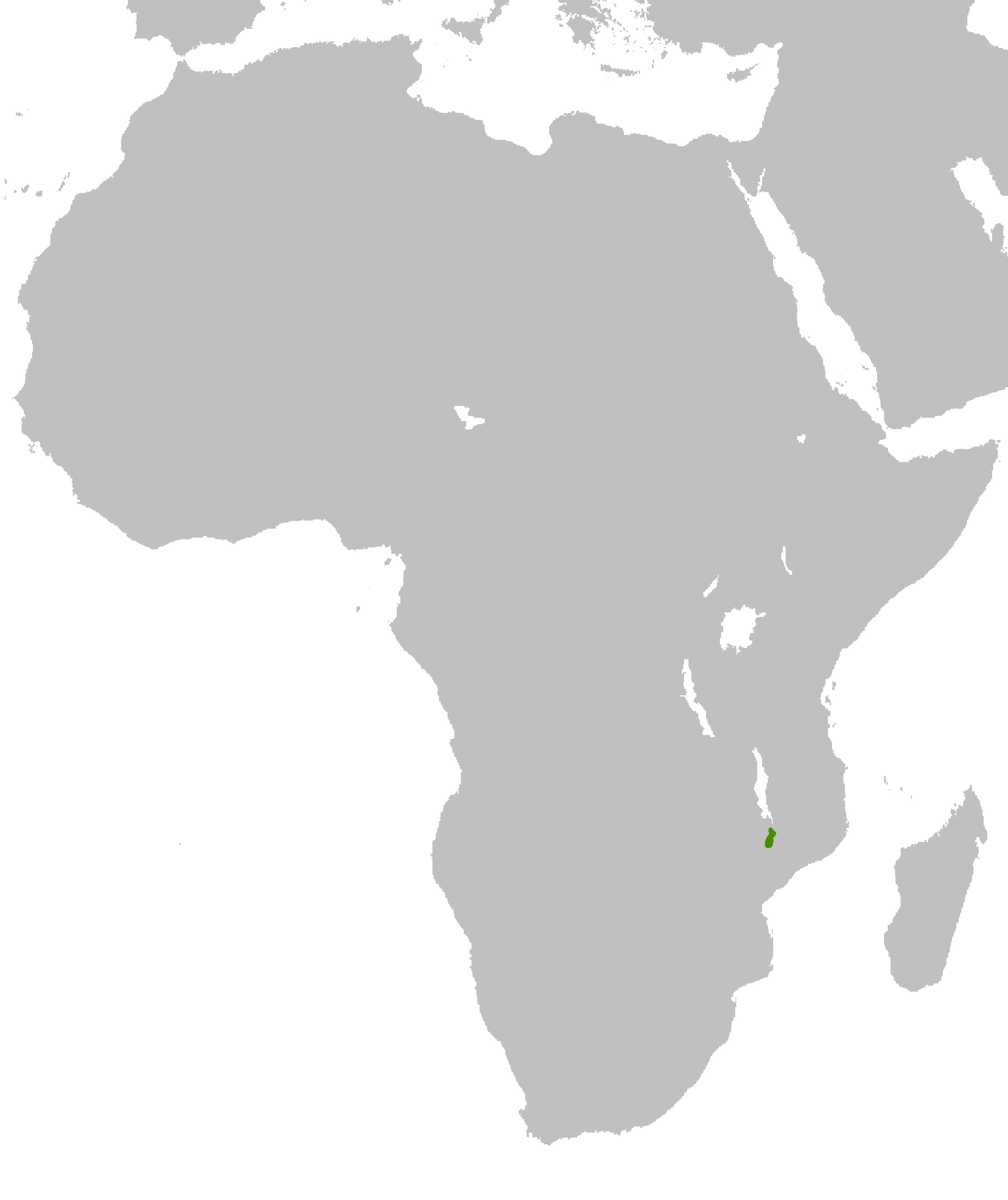

Species of rodent

The Johnston's African dormouse (Graphiurus johnstoni) is a species of rodent in the family Gliridae. It is found in Malawi, Zambia, and Zimbabwe. Its natural habitat is moist savanna.
