= Silent dormouse =

Conservation status
- Data Deficient (IUCN 3.1)

Scientific classification
- Domain: Eukaryota
- Kingdom: Animalia
- Phylum: Chordata
- Class: Mammalia
- Order: Rodentia
- Family: Gliridae
- Genus: Graphiurus
- Species: G. surdus

Binomial name
- Graphiurus surdus Dollman, 1912
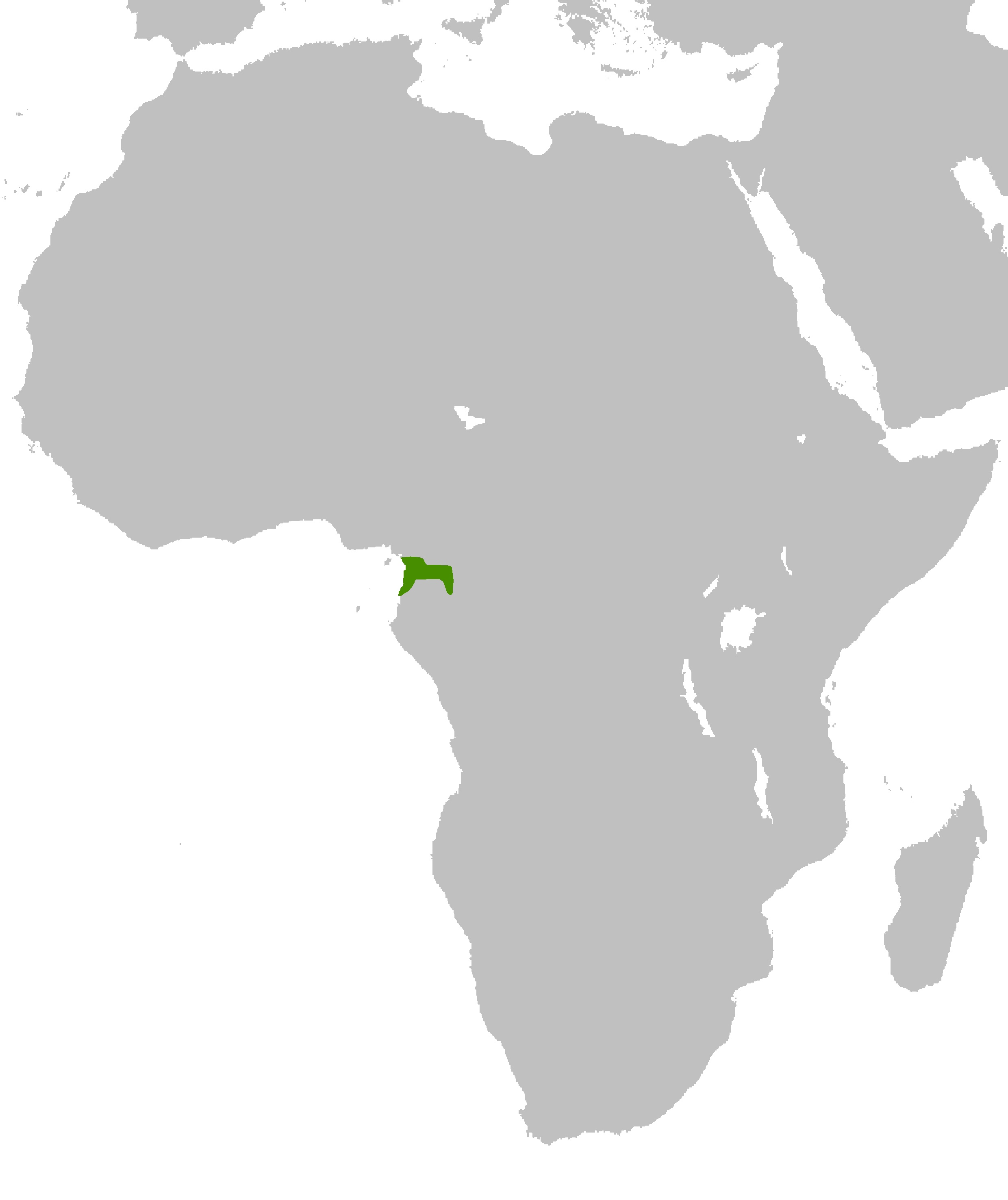

Species of rodent

The silent dormouse (Graphiurus surdus) is a species of rodent in the family Gliridae. It is found in Cameroon, Democratic Republic of the Congo, Equatorial Guinea, and Gabon. Its natural habitat is subtropical or tropical moist lowland forests.
