= Nagtglas's African dormouse =

Conservation status
- Least Concern (IUCN 3.1)

Scientific classification
- Domain: Eukaryota
- Kingdom: Animalia
- Phylum: Chordata
- Class: Mammalia
- Order: Rodentia
- Family: Gliridae
- Genus: Graphiurus
- Species: G. nagtglasii

Binomial name
- Graphiurus nagtglasii Jentink, 1888
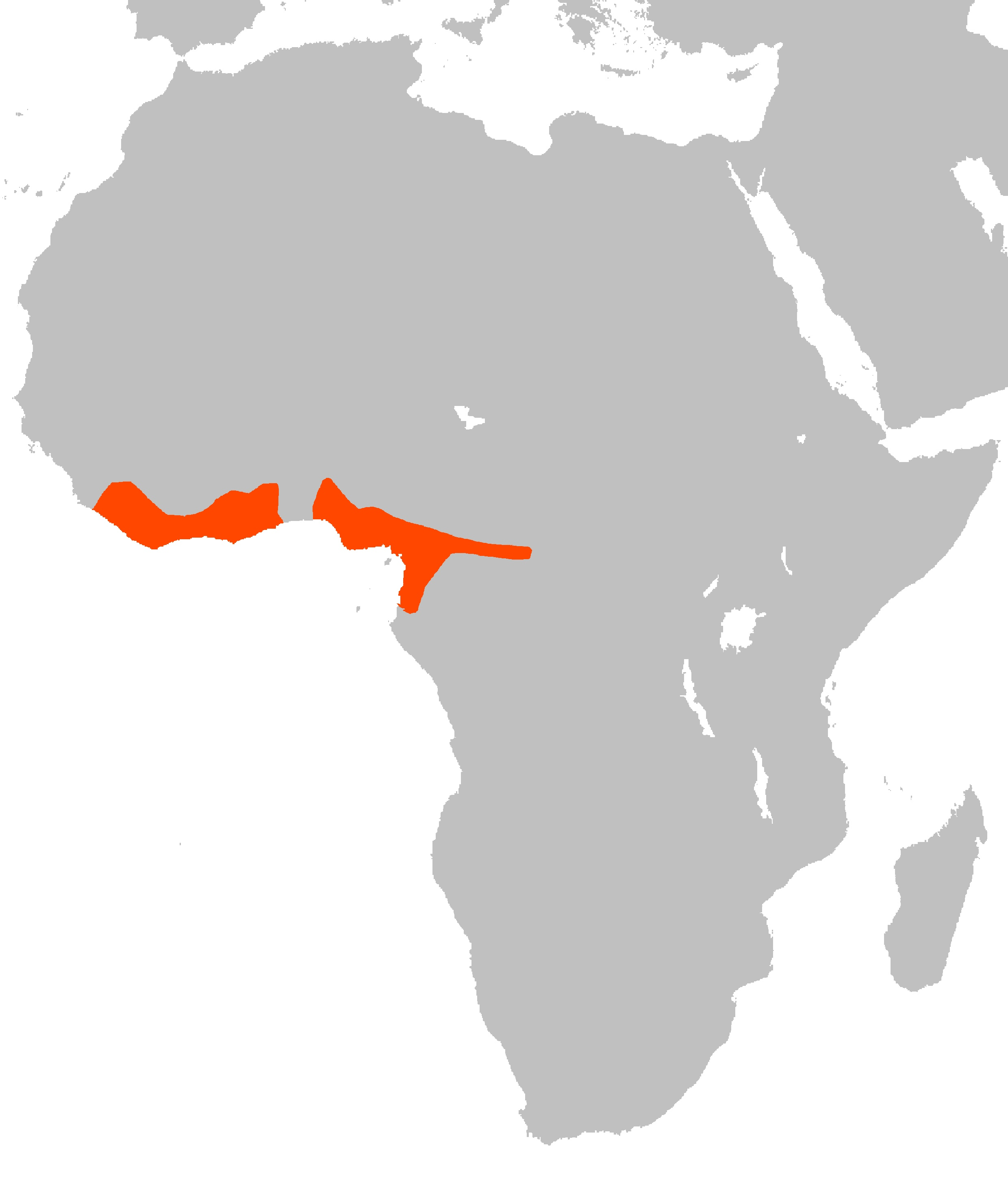

Species of rodent

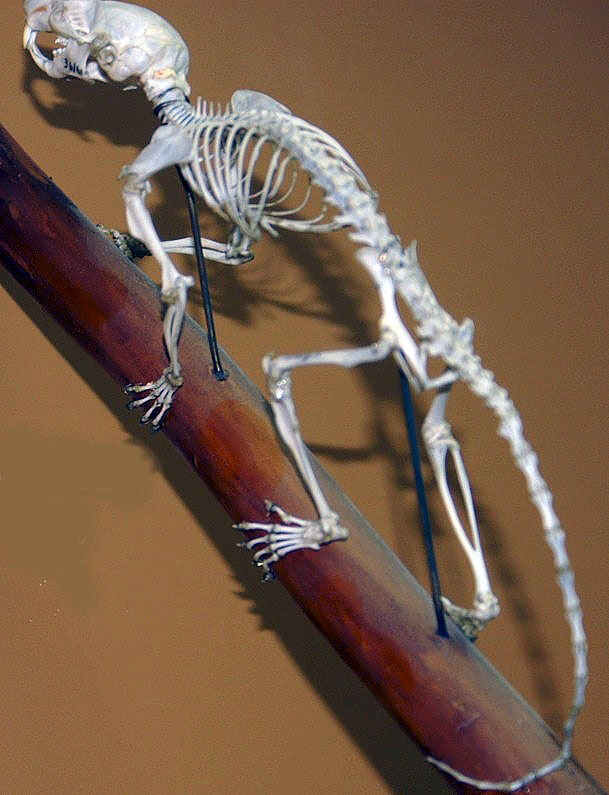
Skeleton of Nagtglas’s African dormouse at the Smithsonian Museum of Natural History.

The Nagtglas's African dormouse (Graphiurus nagtglasii) is a species of rodent in the family Gliridae. It is found in Cameroon, Central African Republic, Ghana, Liberia, Nigeria, Sierra Leone, and possibly Gabon. Its natural habitat is subtropical or tropical, moist, lowland forests. The rodent is named after Cornelis Nagtglas.
