= Lorrain dormouse =

Conservation status
- Least Concern (IUCN 3.1)

Scientific classification
- Domain: Eukaryota
- Kingdom: Animalia
- Phylum: Chordata
- Class: Mammalia
- Order: Rodentia
- Family: Gliridae
- Genus: Graphiurus
- Species: G. lorraineus

Binomial name
- Graphiurus lorraineus Dollman, 1910
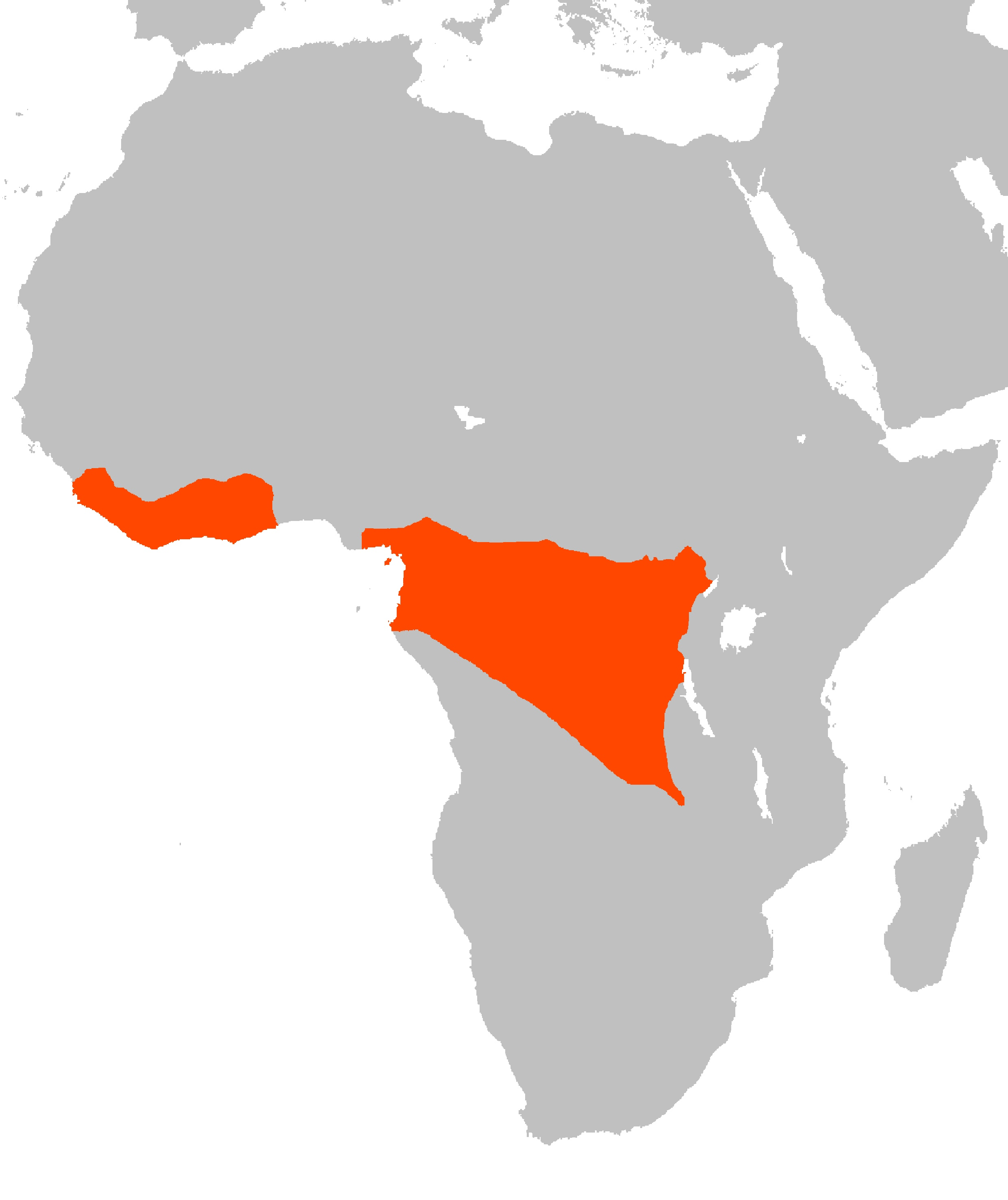

Species of rodent

The Lorrain dormouse (Graphiurus lorraineus) is a species of rodent in the family Gliridae. It is found in Cameroon, Democratic Republic of the Congo, Ghana, Guinea-Bissau, Liberia, Nigeria, Sierra Leone, Tanzania, and Uganda. Its natural habitats are subtropical or tropical, moist, lowland forests, moist savanna, and plantations .
