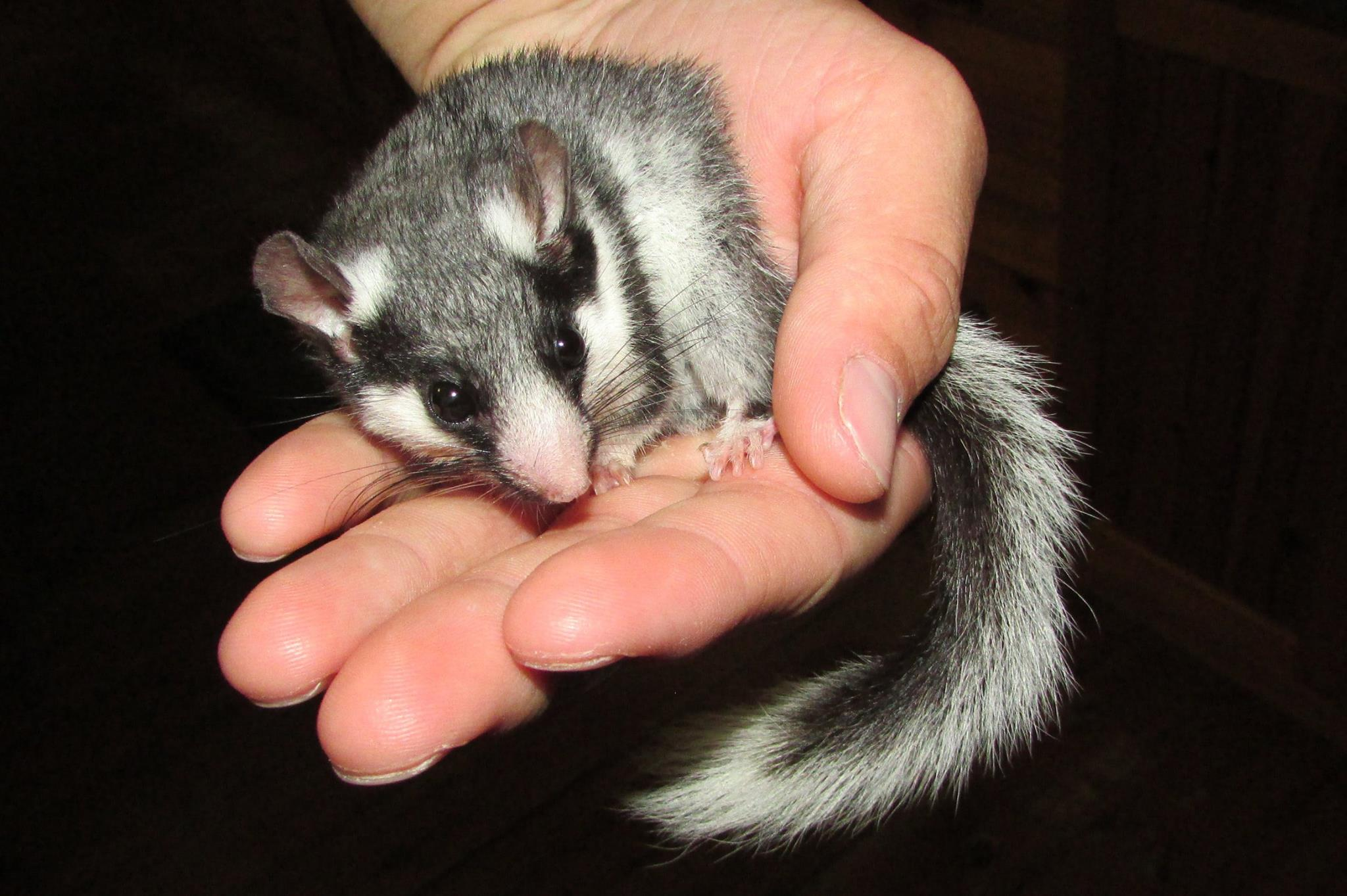

Conservation status
- Least Concern (IUCN 3.1)

Scientific classification
- Kingdom: Animalia
- Phylum: Chordata
- Class: Mammalia
- Order: Rodentia
- Family: Gliridae
- Genus: Graphiurus
- Species: G. ocularis

Binomial name
- Graphiurus ocularis (A. Smith, 1829)
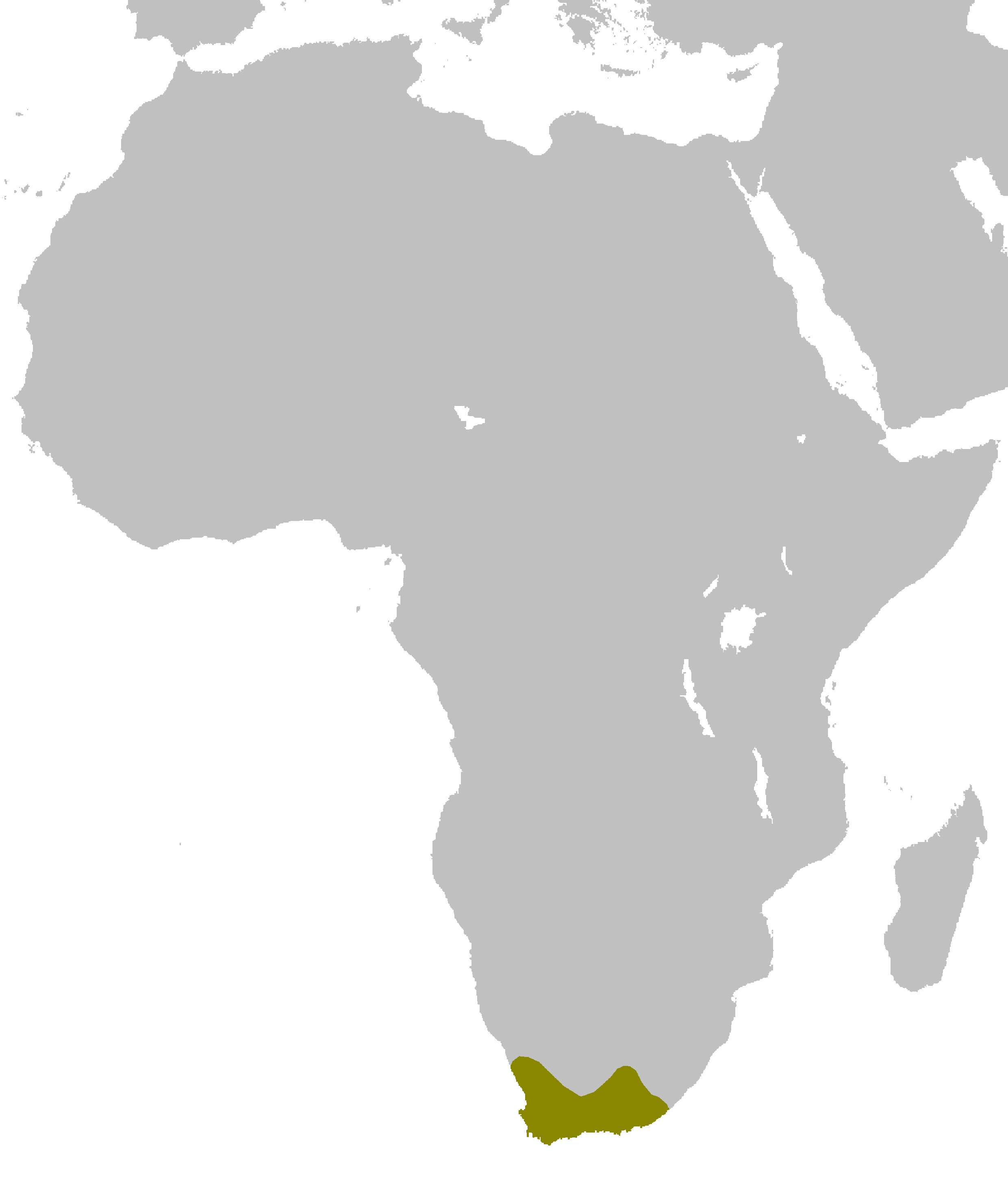

= Spectacled dormouse =

Species of rodent

The spectacled dormouse or namtap (Graphiurus ocularis) is a species of rodent in the family Gliridae, and one of four dormouse species endemic to South Africa.

== Description ==
It has a bushy, squirrel-like tail, a fairly short muzzle, small ears and soft fur. Its face is marked with white and grey, with dark rings (spectacles) around its eyes. Its cheeks, underparts and the upper surfaces of its paws are white. Its tail is also usually tipped with white.

== Distribution and habitat ==
Its distribution is restricted to the Cederberg in western South Africa, and it is associated with rocky habitats, as well as trees and outbuildings. It is nocturnal and an agile climber.

=== Diet ===
Its diet consists primarily of seeds, other plant material and invertebrates. They have been remarked to eat certain types of scorpions as well and will kill other mice or smaller rat species in their territory.
