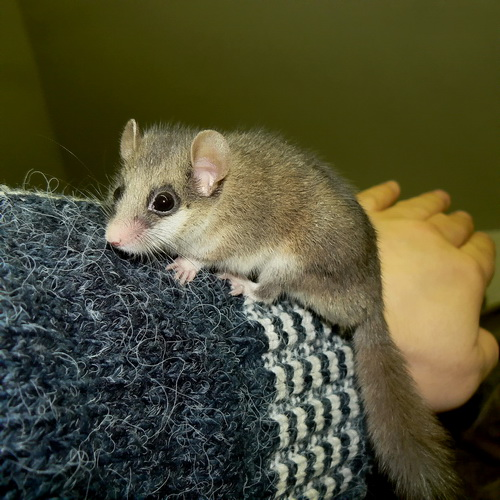

Conservation status
- Least Concern (IUCN 3.1)

Scientific classification
- Kingdom: Animalia
- Phylum: Chordata
- Class: Mammalia
- Order: Rodentia
- Family: Gliridae
- Genus: Graphiurus
- Species: G. murinus

Binomial name
- Graphiurus murinus (Desmarest, 1822)
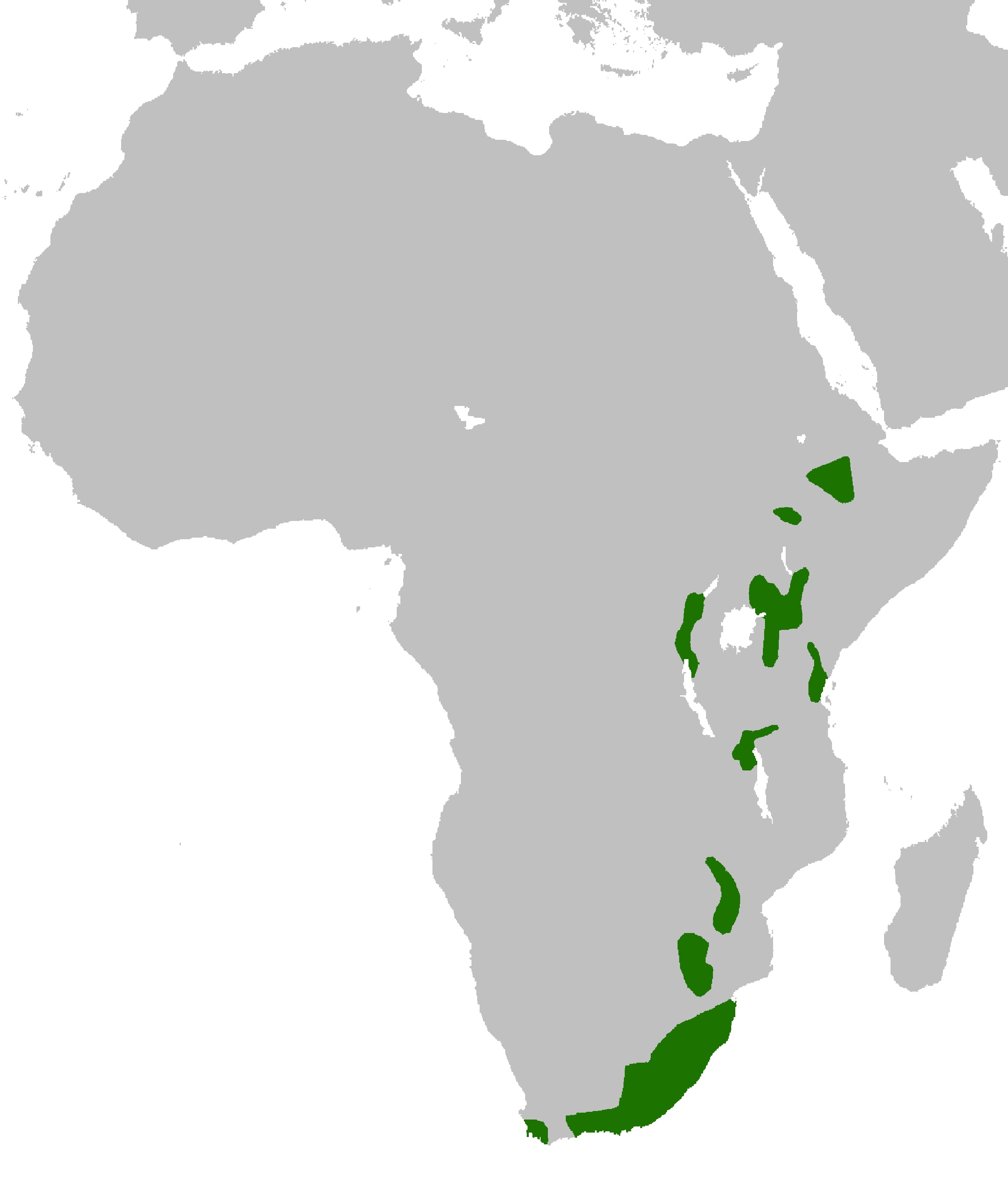

= Woodland dormouse =

Species of rodent

The woodland dormouse (Graphiurus murinus) is a species of rodent in the family Gliridae. It is native to southern and eastern Africa and is also known as the African dormouse, African dwarf dormouse, African pygmy dormouse, or colloquially as micro squirrel. Found in limited numbers in the pet trade, it has complicated care requirements compared to other pet rodents. Its natural habitats are subtropical or tropical, moist montane forests and rivers.

== Description ==
This is a small species with soft silky hair. The eyes are large, the cheeks whitish and the ears rounded and brown. The upper parts of the body are some shade of golden or greyish-brown, sometimes with a coppery or reddish tinge, and with a darker streak running along the spine in some individuals. The underparts are pale grey flushed with white or cream. The hind feet are usually white with a dark streak. The bushy tail is about 85% of the length of the head-and-body, and is the same colour as the dorsal fur.

== Distribution and habitat ==
The woodland dormouse is native to Africa where it is found in Burundi, Ethiopia, Chad, Kenya, Lesotho, Malawi, Mozambique, Rwanda, Somalia, South Africa, Tanzania, Uganda, Zambia, and Zimbabwe. It is found in a range of habitats including woodland, grassland, savannah and rocky areas. In some localities it is found in woodland where Combretum is dominant. It also occurs in degraded and secondary habitats and sometimes enters buildings. It is mostly a forest species and occurs at altitudes between about 1,000 and 4,000 m (3,300 and 13,100 ft).

== Ecology ==
Like other members of its family this dormouse is mostly arboreal, but in some locations it is a rock-climbing rodent. It is an omnivore. The diet includes insects and other small invertebrates, stems, leaves, flowers, seeds and fruit. It builds a nest, usually in a crevice or hole in a tree; other nest locations have included abandoned swallows' nests, human habitations, among mosses and other epiphytes, and in the middle of a bush, where the globular structure had a side entrance. Under certain conditions of temperature and food availability, this dormouse can enter a state of torpor.

== Status ==
G. murinus is a common species and no particular threats have been identified. The International Union for Conservation of Nature has assessed its conservation status as being of "least concern".
