= Monard's dormouse =

Conservation status
- Data Deficient (IUCN 3.1)

Scientific classification
- Kingdom: Animalia
- Phylum: Chordata
- Class: Mammalia
- Order: Rodentia
- Family: Gliridae
- Genus: Graphiurus
- Species: G. monardi

Binomial name
- Graphiurus monardi (St. Leger, 1936)
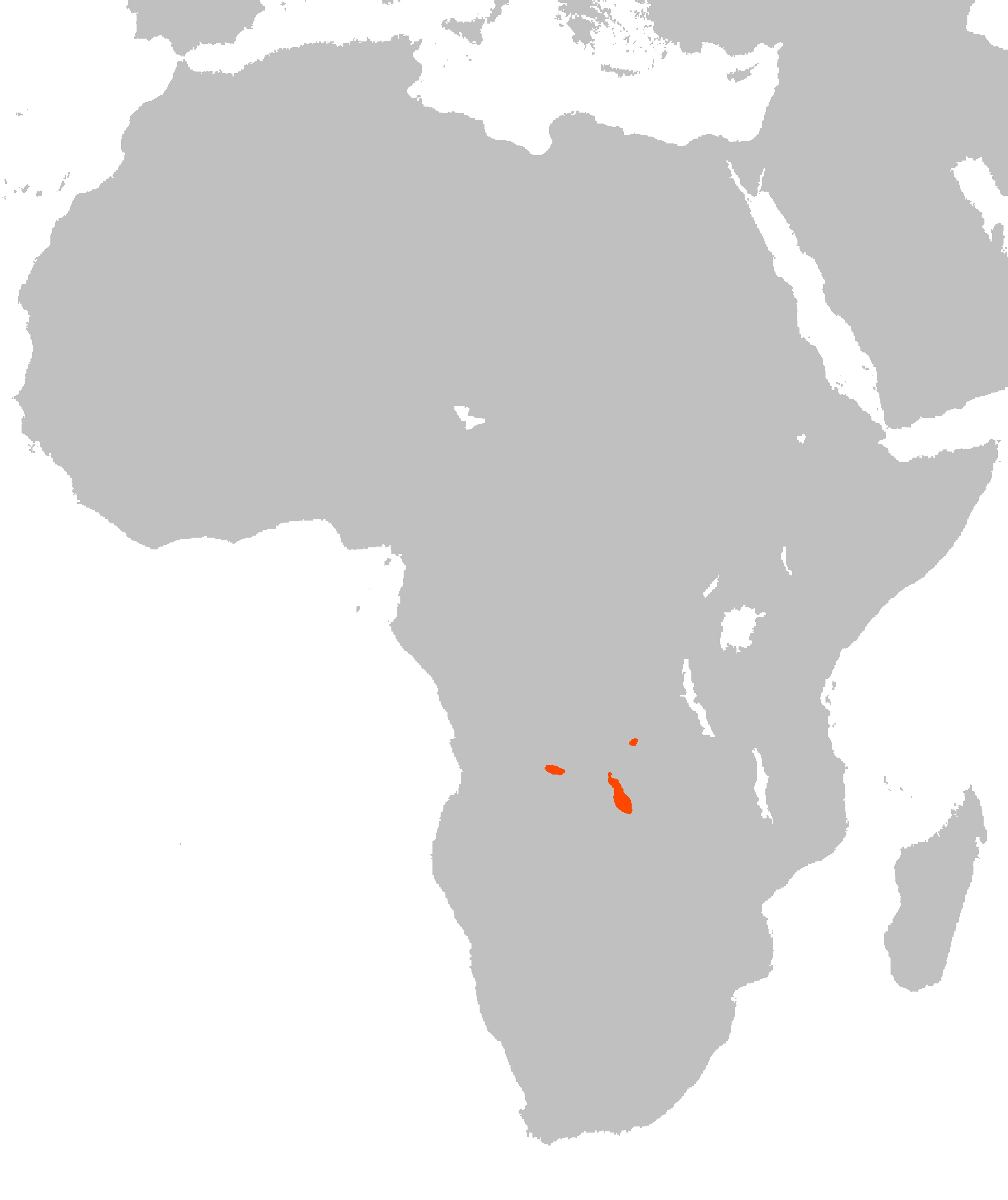

Species of rodent

Monard's dormouse (Graphiurus monardi) is a species of rodent in the family Gliridae. It is found in Angola, Democratic Republic of the Congo, and possibly Zambia. Its natural habitat is moist Central Zambezian miombo woodlands savanna.
