= Balochistan forest dormouse =

Conservation status
- Vulnerable (IUCN 3.1)

Scientific classification
- Kingdom: Animalia
- Phylum: Chordata
- Class: Mammalia
- Order: Rodentia
- Family: Gliridae
- Genus: Dryomys
- Species: D. niethammeri

Binomial name
- Dryomys niethammeri Holden, 1996

Species of rodent

The Balochistan forest dormouse (Dryomys niethammeri) is a species of rodent in the family Gliridae, the dormice, and the subfamily Leithiinae, the garden anf forest dormice. This dormouse is endemic to junper forest in the Balochistan province of Pakistan.

== Taxonomy ==
The Balochistan forest dormouse was first formally described in 1996 by the American mammalogist Mary Ellen Holden with its type locality given as Pakistan: Balochistan province; 1 mile (1.6 km) east of Ziarat at 30.25 N, 67.49 E. This species is similar to the widespread forest dormouse (D. nitedula) and the woolly dormouse (D. laniger). which is endemic to Turkey, and these three species make up the genus Dryomys. This genus is in the subfamily Leithinae of the dormouse family Gliridae.

== Etymology ==
The Balochistan forest dormouse has the specific name, niethammeri, which honours the German zoologist Jochen Niethammer who researched dormice and the biogeography of the Middle East.

== Description ==
The Balochistan forest dormouse is separated from its congeners by differences in the morphology of its skull and teeth. It is otherwise similar to the forest dormouse, particularly the specimens from the arid regions of Central Asia, and both this species and the forest dormouse are larger than the woolly dormouse.

== Distribution and habitat ==
The Balochistan forest dormouse is known only from juniper forest around Ziarat, however deforestation has caused decrease in their population.

== Conservation status ==
The Balochistan forest dormouse has been assessed as Vulnerable by the International Union for Conservation of Nature as it is only known from a single location where its juniper forest habitat has been degraded.
