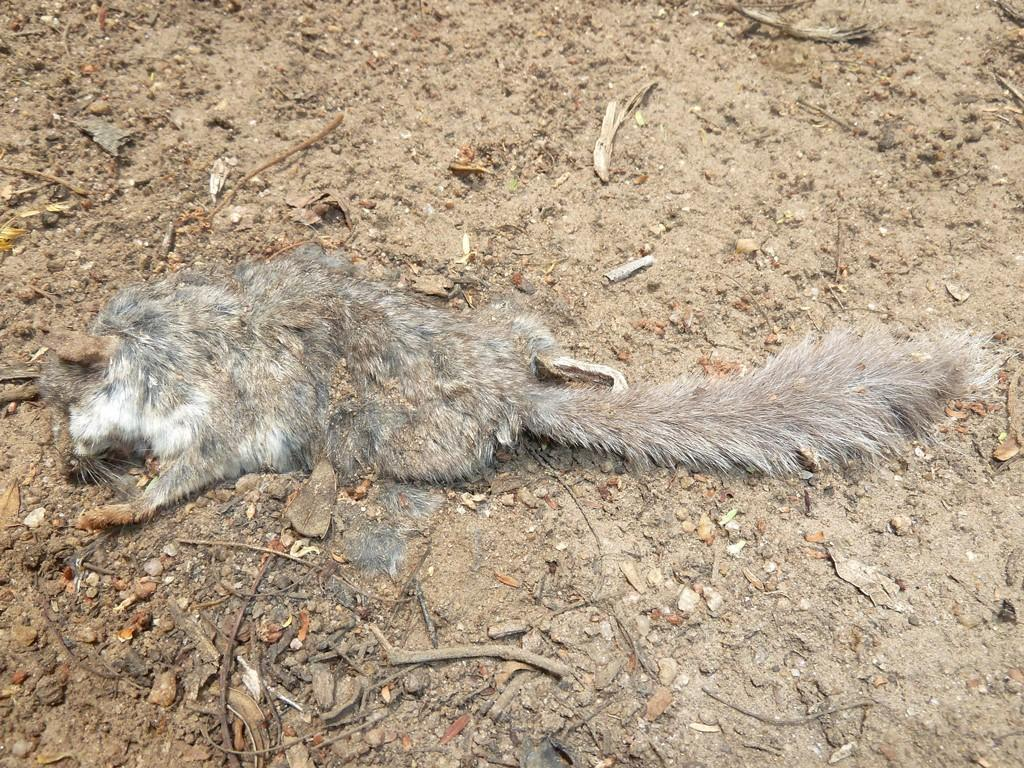

Conservation status
- Least Concern (IUCN 3.1)

Scientific classification
- Kingdom: Animalia
- Phylum: Chordata
- Class: Mammalia
- Order: Rodentia
- Family: Gliridae
- Genus: Graphiurus
- Species: G. microtis

Binomial name
- Graphiurus microtis (Noack, 1887)
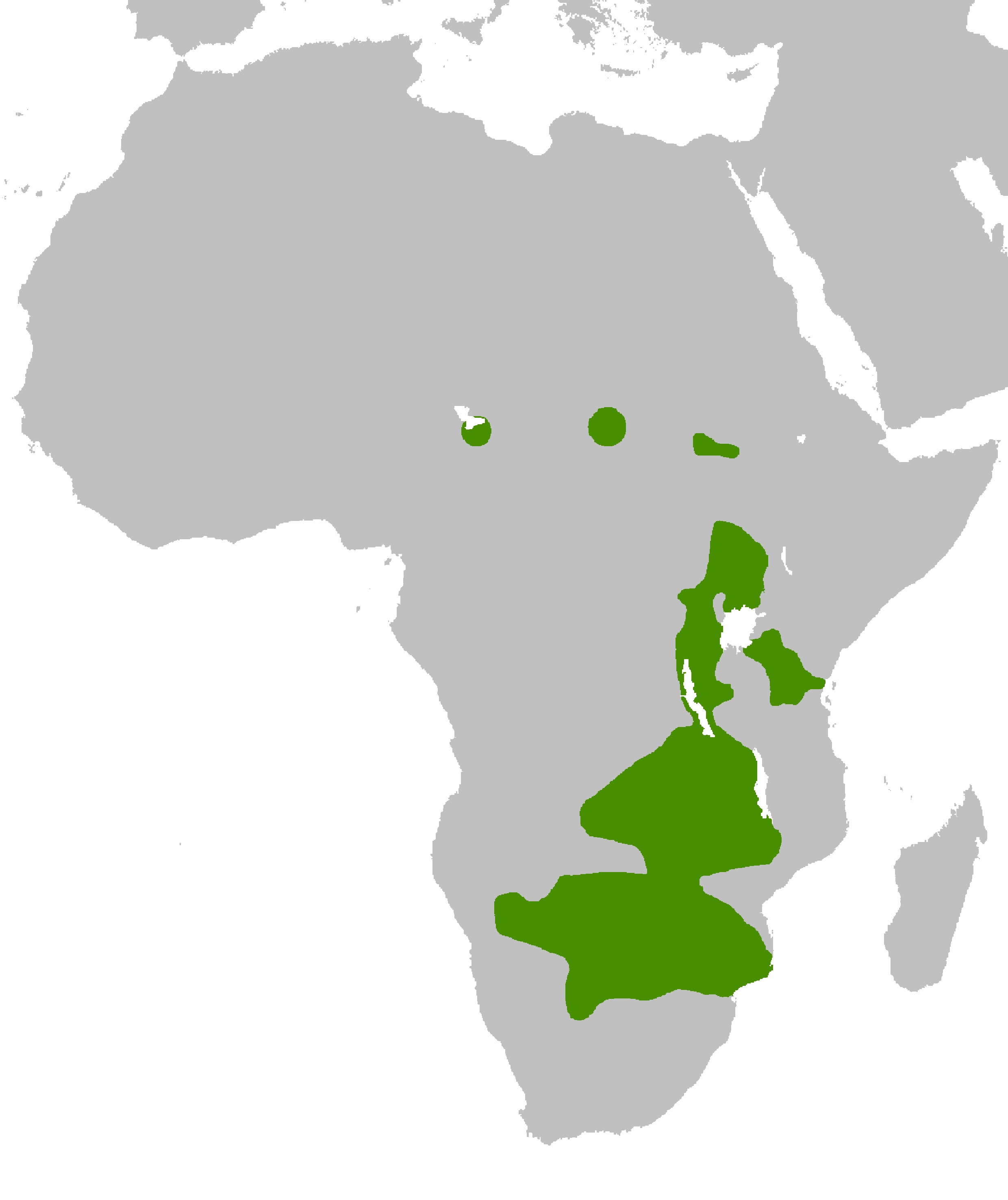

= Small-eared dormouse =

Species of rodent

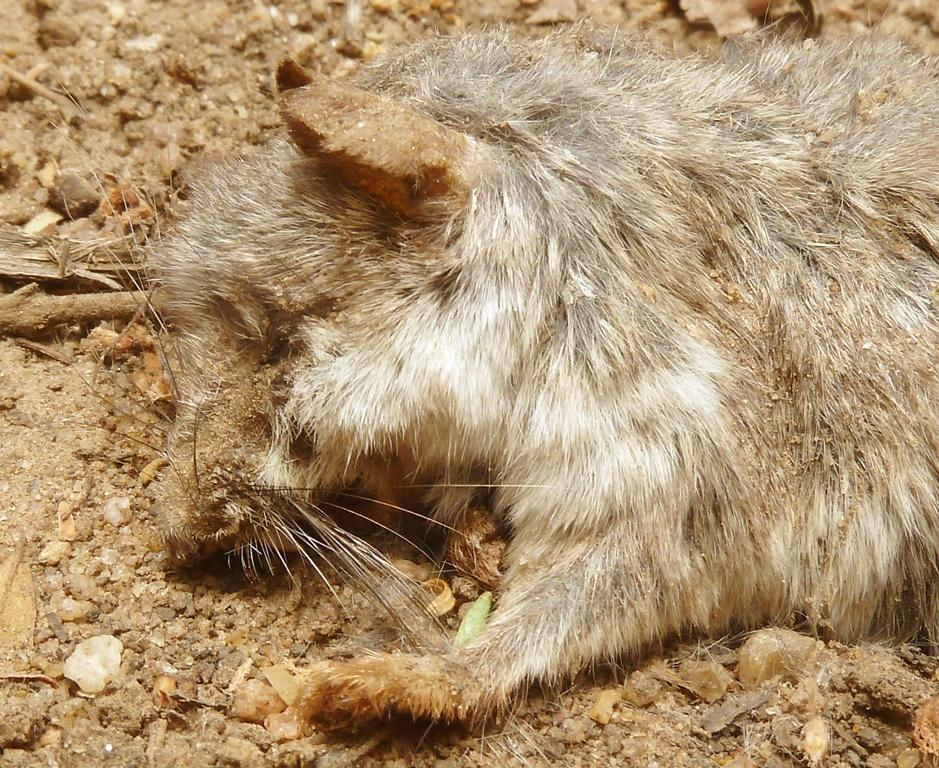
Small-eared Dormouse

The small-eared dormouse (Graphiurus microtis) is a species of rodent in the family Gliridae. It is found in Angola, Botswana, Eritrea, Ethiopia, Kenya, Lesotho, Malawi, Mozambique, Namibia, South Africa, Sudan, Eswatini, Tanzania, Zambia, and Zimbabwe.
