= Setzer's mouse-tailed dormouse =

Conservation status
- Data Deficient (IUCN 3.1)

Scientific classification
- Kingdom: Animalia
- Phylum: Chordata
- Class: Mammalia
- Infraclass: Placentalia
- Order: Rodentia
- Family: Gliridae
- Genus: Myomimus
- Species: M. setzeri

Binomial name
- Myomimus setzeri Rossolimo, 1976

Species of rodent

The Setzer's mouse-tailed dormouse (Myomimus setzeri) is a species of rodent in the family Gliridae. It is endemic to Iran. Very little information is available for this species, with only 10 specimens known. It is known mainly from the pellets of the Eurasian eagle owl.
