= Rock dormouse =

Conservation status
- Least Concern (IUCN 3.1)

Scientific classification
- Kingdom: Animalia
- Phylum: Chordata
- Class: Mammalia
- Order: Rodentia
- Family: Gliridae
- Genus: Graphiurus
- Species: G. platyops

Binomial name
- Graphiurus platyops Thomas, 1897
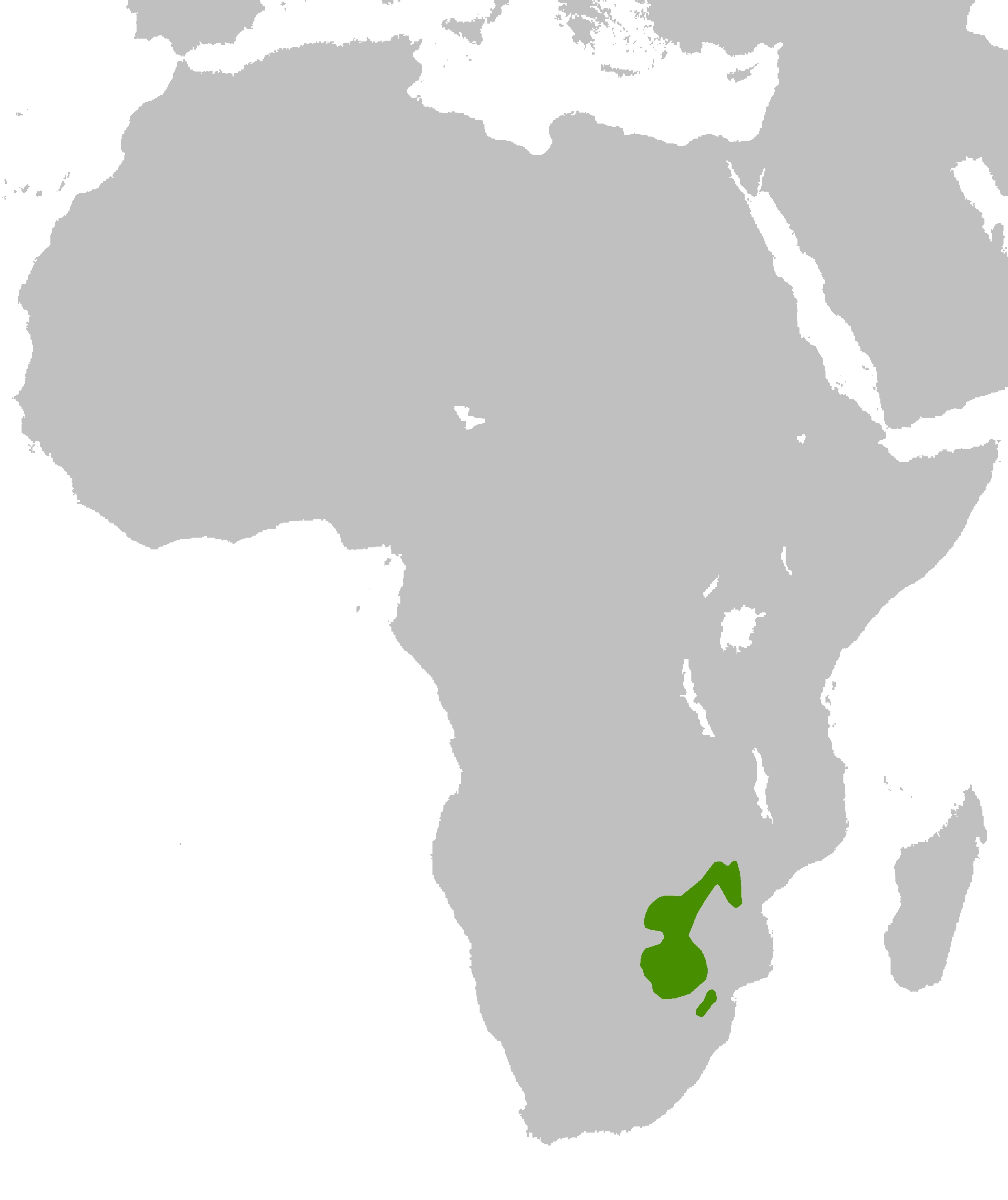

Species of rodent

The rock dormouse or flat-headed African dormouse (Graphiurus platyops) is a species of rodent in the family Gliridae. It is found in Botswana, Mozambique, South Africa, Eswatini, Zambia, and Zimbabwe where it lives among rocks in upland areas. It is a fairly common, mainly nocturnal species and the International Union for Conservation of Nature has assessed its conservation status as being of "least concern".

== Description ==
The rock dormouse is a moderate sized species with a head-and-body length of 95 to 122 mm (3.7 to 4.8 in) and a tail of 65 to 98 mm (2.6 to 3.9 in), weighing between 30 and 53 g (1.1 and 1.9 oz). The fur on the back is soft, smooth and rather long, being around 10 mm (0.4 in) on the rump with guard hairs of 13 mm (0.5 in). The dorsal colour varies from grey to some shade of greyish-brown. The underparts are white or cream tinted with grey, and there is a sharp line demarcating the junction between the dorsal and ventral colouring. The crown matches the colour of the back but the muzzle is paler. The ears are fairly large and rounded and the eyes are large. There is a conspicuous mask around the eyes and the cheeks are white, this colour extending in a band to the shoulders. The hind feet are usually white but may have dark streaks on top. The tail has short fur near the base and longer hair near the tip, where the hair may be as long as 30 mm (1.2 in). It is grey or greyish-brown, flecked with white, and has a white tip.

== Distribution ==
The rock dormouse is endemic to southern Africa. Its range extends through southern Malawi, Zambia, Zimbabwe, central Mozambique, eastern Botswana, northeastern South Africa and northwestern Eswatini, mostly at altitudes above 600 m (2,000 ft). Its typical habitat is in rocky outcrops, in kopjes (rocky, elevated areas on an otherwise flat plain), krantzes (steep rock faces) and piles of boulders, sometimes in association with the yellow-spotted rock hyrax and the rock hyrax. It has been found in scrubby thickets in a dried up stream bed in Mozambique, and in caves in South Africa.

== Ecology ==
The rock dormouse lives in cracks and crevices in rocky places, its cranium being flattened to enable it to pass through narrow apertures. It is mostly nocturnal but is sometimes active early in the morning. The diet is omnivorous, and includes seeds, green plant material and insects such as moths. It is a solitary animal and warns off intruders by lashing its tail and emitting soft warning calls. If the intruder persists, a different, more aggressive call is used, and a fight may erupt.

== Status ==
The rock dormouse is a fairly common species in suitable habitat and faces no particular threats. It occurs in several protected areas and the International Union for Conservation of Nature has assessed its conservation status as being of "least concern".
