= Roach's mouse-tailed dormouse =

Conservation status
- Vulnerable (IUCN 3.1)

Scientific classification
- Kingdom: Animalia
- Phylum: Chordata
- Class: Mammalia
- Order: Rodentia
- Family: Gliridae
- Genus: Myomimus
- Species: M. roachi

Binomial name
- Myomimus roachi (Bate, 1937)
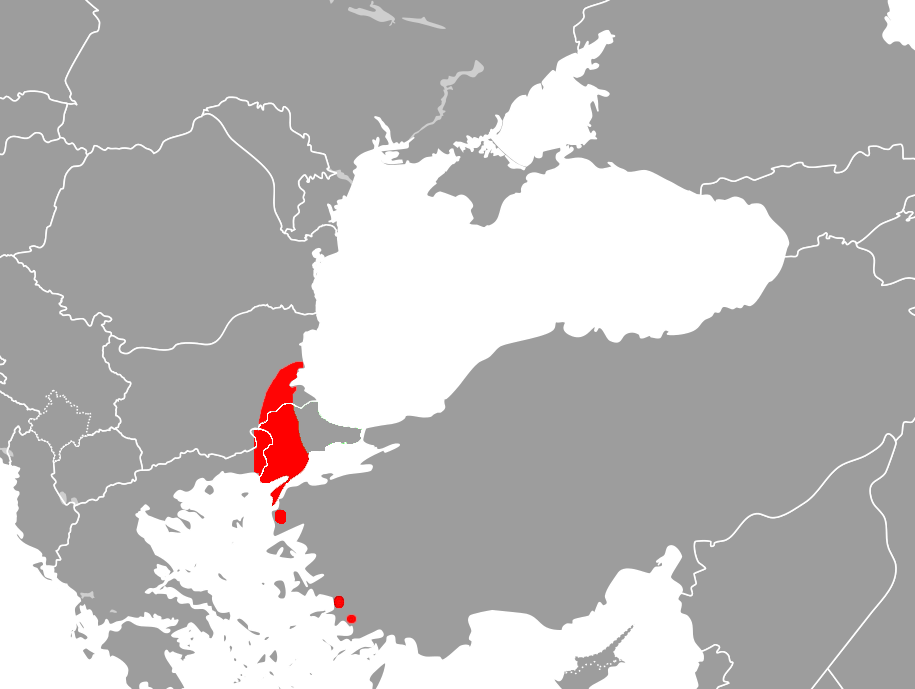
- Roach's mouse-tailed dormouse's range

Species of rodent

The Roach's mouse-tailed dormouse or ground dormouse (Myomimus roachi), also known simply as the mouse-tailed dormouse, is a species of rodent in the family Gliridae. It is found in Bulgaria, European Turkey, and Greece.

== Distribution ==
It is historically found in Turkey and south-eastern Bulgaria, with its presence recently confirmed in Greece. As oak and walnut trees were removed for agriculture and forestry, its distribution became restricted to a few small spinneys in Edirne, in north-west Turkey. In 2017 the species was confirmed to be still living in Bulgaria.

== Habitat ==
Roach's mouse-tailed dormouse lives in scrub and semi-open habitats with trees or bushes such as orchards, vineyards, hedgerows in arable land, and river banks. Old trees are essential elements in their habitat because the dormouse uses hollows of old trees to sleep during the day or rest at night.

== Behavior ==
The mouse-tailed dormouse is nocturnal, which means that they are active at night. Dormice are active from 1–2 hours before sunset till 1–2 hours after sunrise. In addition, the mouse-tailed dormouse is not strictly arboreal as it uses both trees and ground for moving and feeding. It also uses open areas such as grasslands, cereal fields, and even recently plowed agricultural land for moving and searching for food (such as insects and seeds), which makes it easier food for predators. The same animal uses few different trees with hollows for resting, and one tree can be used for one or more consecutive days. The same tree hollows are used by different individuals at different times.

== Natural facts ==
The mouse-tailed dormouse is distributed throughout east Europe, most predominantly East Bulgaria. Additionally, fossils of the mouse-tailed dormouse have been found in northern parts of Bulgaria, dating back to the Early Pleistocene Epoch within the Quaternary Period. It inhabits semi-open agricultural habitats with trees or bushes. It is most active from the first half of April to the second half of November. Copulations are around the second half of April to the beginning of May. Young females may have 5-6 young per litter while older females may have larger litters.

== Local names ==
- Bulgarian: мишевиден сънливец /misheviden sǎnlivets/ (lit. "mouse-like sleeper"), български мишевиден сънливец /bǎlgarski misheviden sǎnlivets/ (lit. "Bulgarian mouse-like sleeper"), български сънливец /bǎlgarski sǎnlivets/ (lit. "Bulgarian sleeper")
- Greek: μυωξός του Roach (lit. "Roach's dormouse")
- Turkish: yer yediuyuru (lit. "ground seven-sleepers"), farebenzeri yediuyur (lit. "mouse-like seven-sleepers"), faremsi uyur (lit. "mouse-like sleeper"), sıçankuyruklu fındıkfaresi (lit. "mouse-tailed hazel-mouse"), boz kakırca (lit. "gray dormouse")
