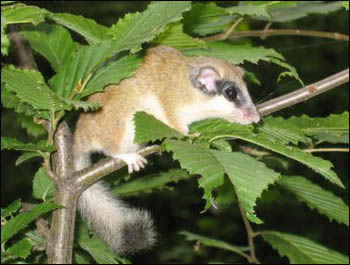
- Dryomys nitedula

Scientific classification
- Kingdom: Animalia
- Phylum: Chordata
- Class: Mammalia
- Infraclass: Placentalia
- Order: Rodentia
- Family: Gliridae
- Subfamily: Leithiinae
- Genus: Dryomys; Thomas, 1905

Type species
- Mus nitedula Pallas, 1778

= Dryomys =

Genus of rodents

Dryomys is a genus of dormouse. Collectively the members of the genus are referred to as forest dormice, although the type species also goes by the common name forest dormouse. The genus name comes from the Greek δρῦς (drûs) "oak" and μῦς (mûs) "mouse".

== Species ==
The species within the genus Dryomys are:

- Dryomys laniger – woolly dormouse
- Dryomys niethammeri – Balochistan forest dormouse
- Dryomys nitedula – forest dormouse
