= Jentink's dormouse =

Conservation status
- Data Deficient (IUCN 3.1)

Scientific classification
- Domain: Eukaryota
- Kingdom: Animalia
- Phylum: Chordata
- Class: Mammalia
- Order: Rodentia
- Family: Gliridae
- Genus: Graphiurus
- Species: G. crassicaudatus

Binomial name
- Graphiurus crassicaudatus (Jentink, 1888)
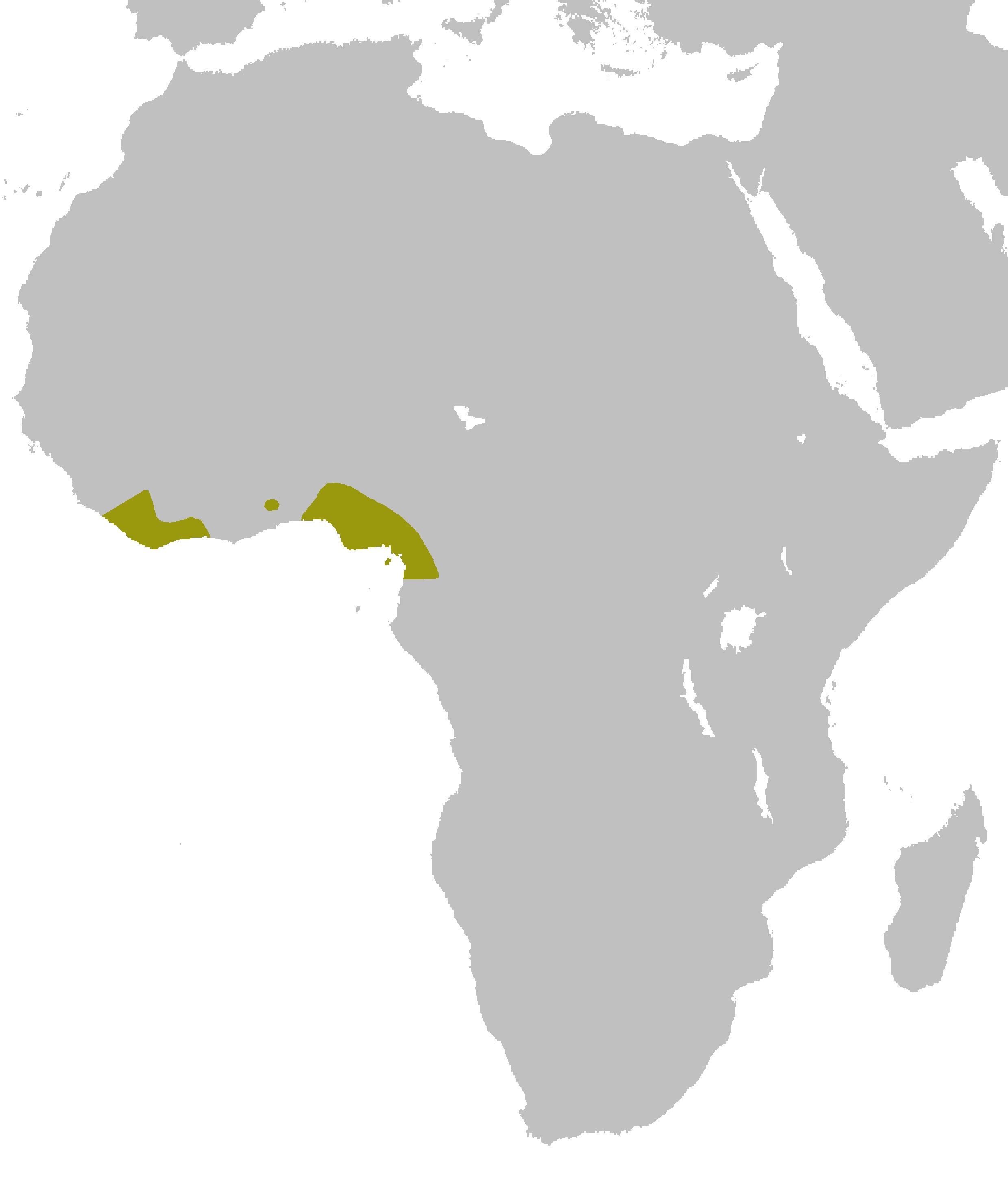

Species of rodent

Jentink's dormouse (Graphiurus crassicaudatus) is a species of rodent in the family Gliridae. It is found in Cameroon, Ivory Coast, Ghana, Liberia, Nigeria, and Togo, and possibly Benin, Equatorial Guinea, and Sierra Leone. Its natural habitat is subtropical or tropical, moist lowland forests.
