= Masked mouse-tailed dormouse =

Conservation status
- Data Deficient (IUCN 3.1)

Scientific classification
- Kingdom: Animalia
- Phylum: Chordata
- Class: Mammalia
- Order: Rodentia
- Family: Gliridae
- Genus: Myomimus
- Species: M. personatus

Binomial name
- Myomimus personatus Ognev, 1924

Species of rodent

The masked mouse-tailed dormouse (Myomimus personatus), also called Ognev's mouse-tailed dormouse, is a species of rodent in the family Gliridae. It is found in Iran and Turkmenistan.
