= Stone dormouse =

Conservation status
- Least Concern (IUCN 3.1)

Scientific classification
- Kingdom: Animalia
- Phylum: Chordata
- Class: Mammalia
- Order: Rodentia
- Family: Gliridae
- Genus: Graphiurus
- Species: G. rupicola

Binomial name
- Graphiurus rupicola (Thomas & Hinton, 1925)
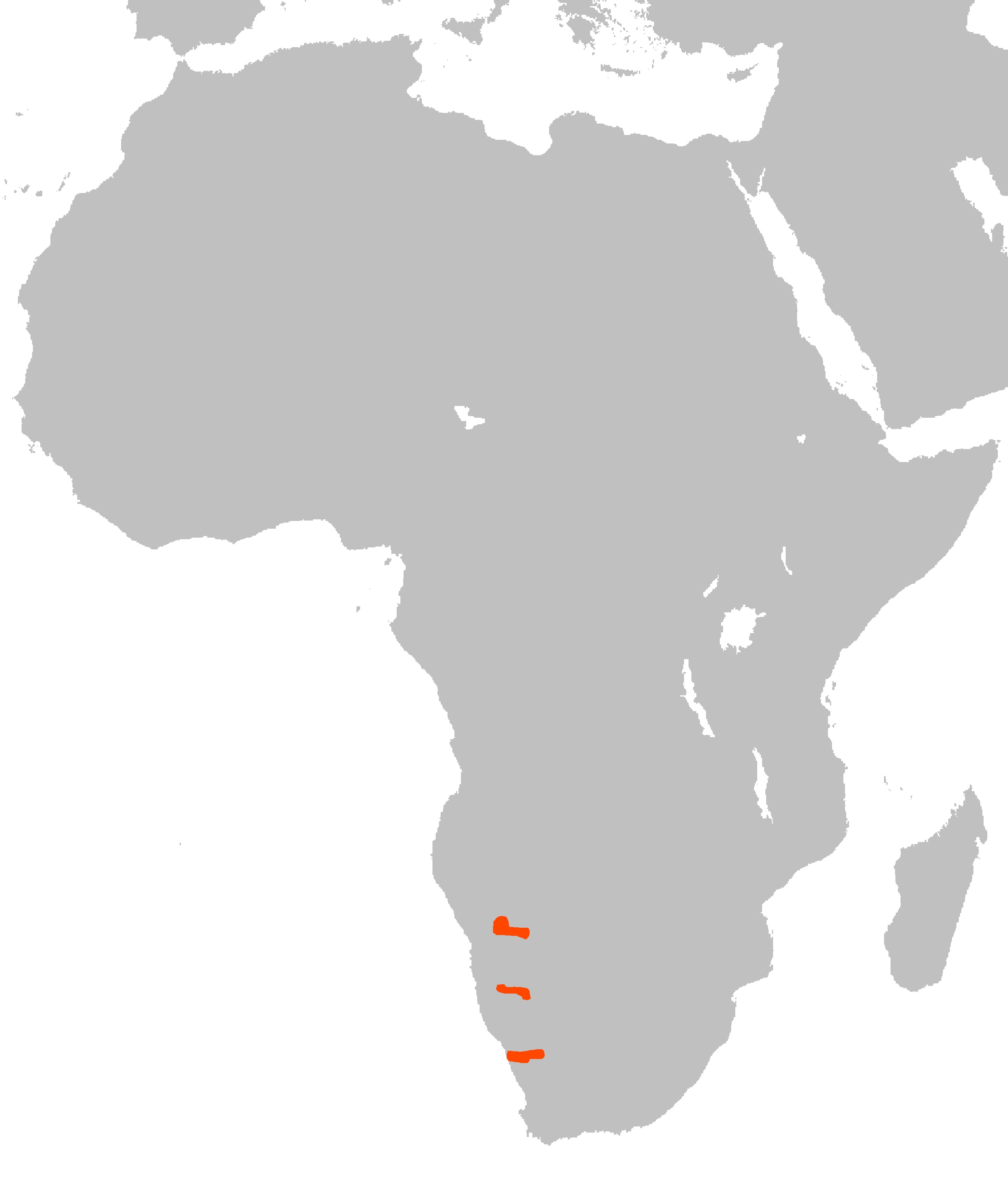

Species of rodent

The stone dormouse (Graphiurus rupicola) is a species of rodent in the family Gliridae. It is found in Namibia, South Africa, and possibly Angola. Its natural habitat is rocky areas in the Karoo. Though it has a limited range, it is a fairly common species and the International Union for Conservation of Nature has assessed its conservation status as being of "least concern".

== Description ==
The stone dormouse is a moderate sized species with a head-and-body length of 105 to 119 mm (4.1 to 4.7 in) and a tail of 96 to 118 mm (3.8 to 4.6 in). The fur on the back is woolly, thick and rather long, being around 10 mm (0.4 in) on the rump with guard hairs of up to 17 mm (0.7 in). The dorsal colour varies from silvery-grey to dull grey or dark grey. The underparts are white or cream tinted with dark grey, and there is a sharp colour divide between the dorsal and ventral areas. The skull is somewhat flattened, the ears are fairly large and oval and the eyes are large. There is a conspicuous mask around the eyes and the cheeks are white, this colour extending in a stripe across the shoulders. The hind feet are usually white but may have dark streaks on top. The tail is long and has short fur near the base and longer hair near the tip, where the hair may be as long as 43 mm (1.7 in). The tail is grey with many white hairs, and has a white tip.

== Distribution and habitat ==
The stone dormouse is endemic to southwestern Africa where its range includes mountainous parts of Namibia and South Africa, with records from a single location in Angola, mostly at altitudes above 400 m (1,300 ft) and up to at least 1,586 m (5,200 ft). Its typical habitat is in rocky outcrops and in kopjes (rocky, elevated areas on an otherwise flat plain) where it lives in crevices. It mostly inhabits Karoo or Karoo transition areas, though the specimens found in Angola were found in evergreen woodland on a mountain summit.

== Status ==
The stone dormouse is a fairly common species in suitable habitat and faces no particular threats. It occurs in several protected areas and the International Union for Conservation of Nature has assessed its conservation status as being of "least concern".
