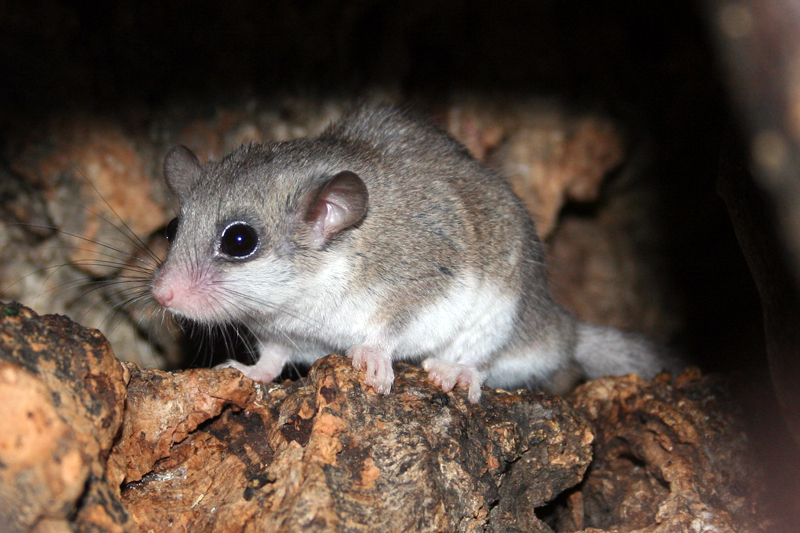
- African dormouse, Graphiurus sp.

Scientific classification
- Kingdom: Animalia
- Phylum: Chordata
- Class: Mammalia
- Order: Rodentia
- Suborder: Sciuromorpha
- Family: Gliridae; Muirhead in Brewster, 1819

Type genus
- Glis Brisson, 1762

Subfamilies and genera
- Graphiurinae: Graphiurus; Leithiinae: Chaetocauda; Dryomys; Eliomys; †Hypnomys; †Leithia; Muscardinus; Myomimus; Selevinia; Glirinae: Glirulus; Glis
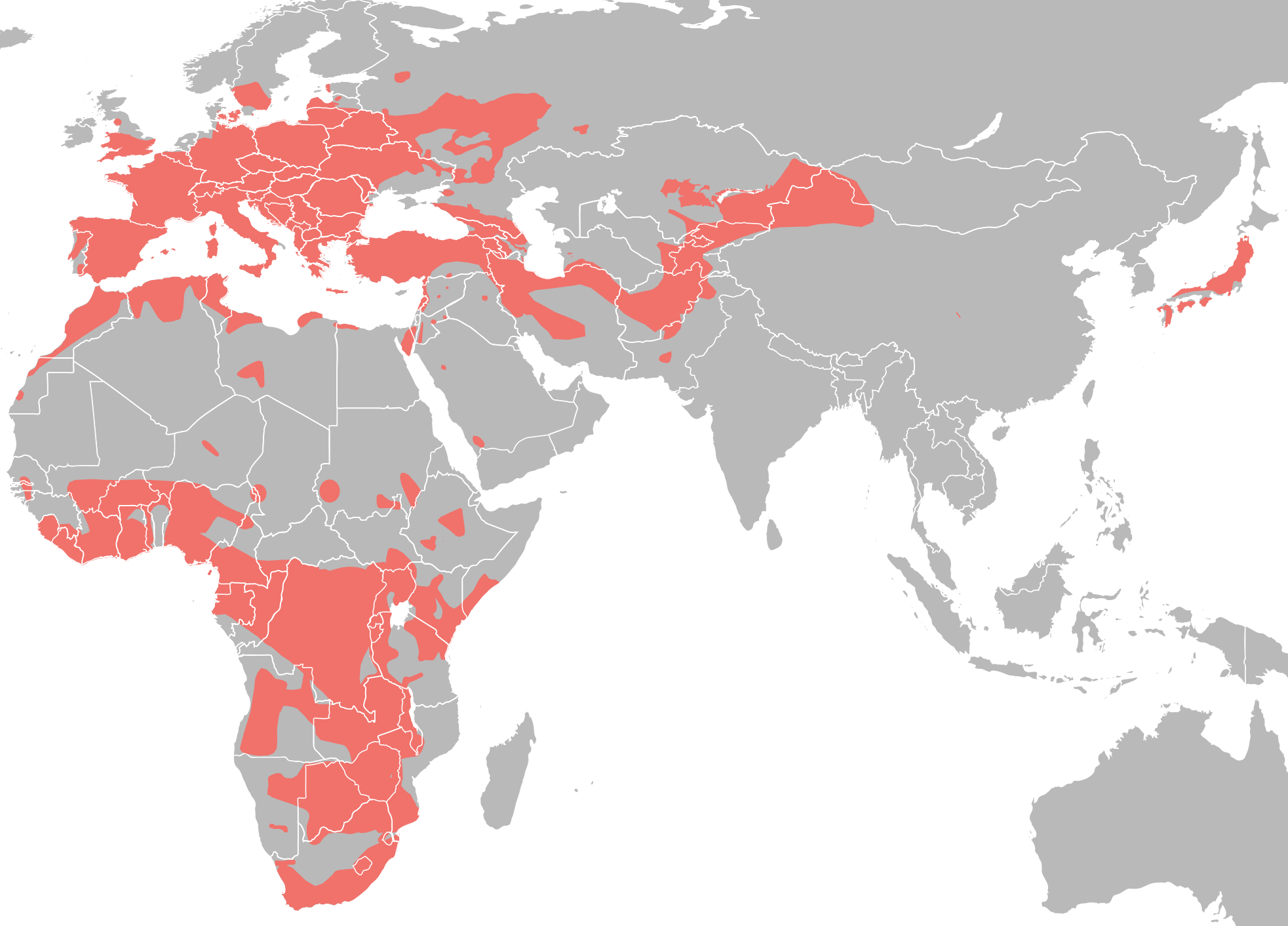
- Gliridae distribution

= Dormouse =

Dormice Temporal range: Early Eocene – Recent

Family of rodents

A dormouse is a rodent of the family Gliridae (this family is also variously called Myoxidae or Muscardinidae by different taxonomists). Dormice are nocturnal animals found in Africa, Asia, and Europe. They are named for their long dormant hibernation period of six months or longer. There are nine genera and 28 living species of dormice, with half of living species belonging to the African genus Graphiurus.

== Etymology ==
The word dormouse comes from Middle English dormous, of uncertain origin, possibly from a dialectal element *dor-, from Old Norse dár 'benumbed' and Middle English mous 'mouse'.

The word is sometimes conjectured to come from an Anglo-Norman derivative of dormir 'to sleep', with the second element mistaken for mouse, but no such Anglo-Norman term is known to have existed.

The Latin noun glīs, which is the origin of the scientific name, descends from the Proto-Indo-European noun *gl̥h₁éys 'weasel, mouse', and is related to Sanskrit गिरि (girí) 'mouse' and Ancient Greek γαλέη (galéē) 'weasel'.

== Characteristics ==
Dormice are small rodents, with body lengths between 6 and 19 cm (2.4 and 7.5 in), and weight between 15 and 180 g (0.53 and 6.35 oz). They are generally mouse-like in appearance, but with furred tails. They are largely arboreal, agile, and well-adapted to climbing. Most species are nocturnal. Dormice have an excellent sense of hearing and signal each other with a variety of vocalisations.

Dormice are omnivorous, and typically feed on berries, flowers, fruits, insects, and nuts. They are unique among rodents in that they lack a cecum, a part of the gut used in other species to ferment vegetable matter. Their dental formula is similar to that of squirrels, although they often lack premolars:

Dentition
1.0.0–1.3
1.0.0–1.3

Dormice breed once (or, occasionally, twice) each year, producing litters with an average of four young after a gestation period of 22–24 days. They can live for as long as five years. The young are born hairless and helpless, and their eyes do not open until about 18 days after birth. They typically become sexually mature after the end of their first hibernation. Dormice live in small family groups, with home ranges that vary widely between species and depend on the availability of food.

=== Hibernation ===
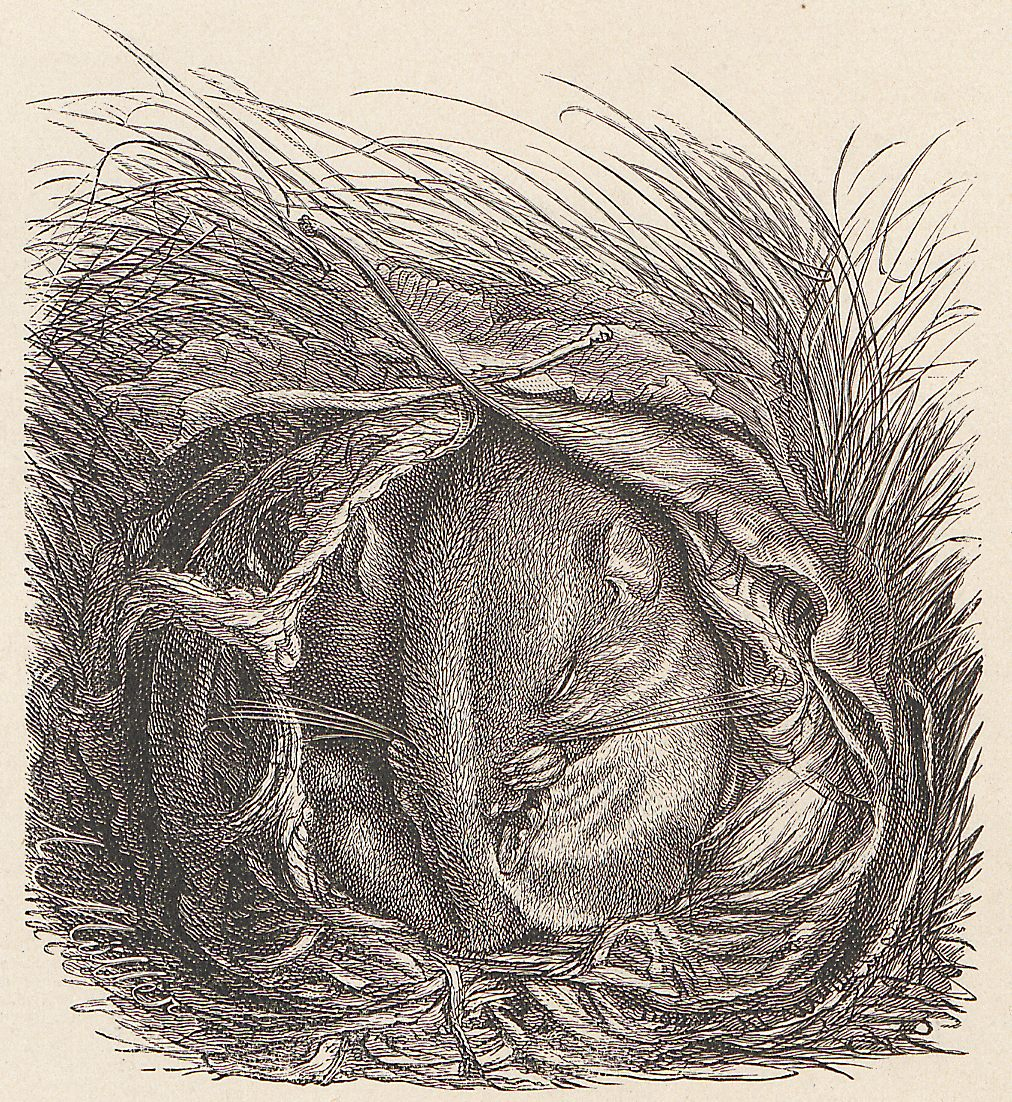
The little dormouse, sleeping in the winter nest.

One of the most notable characteristics of those dormice that live in temperate zones is hibernation. They can hibernate six months out of the year, or even longer if the weather does not become warm enough, sometimes waking for brief periods to eat food they had previously stored nearby. During the summer, they accumulate fat in their bodies to nourish them through the hibernation period.

== Relationship with humans ==
The European edible dormouse (Glis glis) was considered a delicacy in ancient Rome, either as a savoury appetizer or as a dessert (dipped in honey and poppy seeds). The Romans used a special kind of enclosure, a glirarium, to raise and fatten dormice for the table. It is still considered a delicacy in Slovenia and in several places in Croatia, namely Lika, and the islands of Hvar and Brač. Dormouse fat was believed by the Elizabethans to induce sleep since the animal put on fat before hibernating.

In more recent years, dormice have begun to enter the pet trade; however, they are uncommon as pets and are considered an exotic pet. The woodland dormouse (Graphiurus murinus) is the most commonly seen species in the pet trade. Asian garden dormice (Eliomys melanurus) are also occasionally kept as pets.

== Evolution ==
Dormice likely originated in Europe, with the earliest dormouse genus Eogliravus being known from the Early Eocene (around 48-41 million years ago) of France. Dormice were not speciose during the Eocene, but considerably diversified during the following Oligocene (34-23 million years ago). Their ability to hibernate may have emerged during this period. They reached an apex of diversity during the late Early Miocene (around 17 million years ago). There were 18 genera and 36 species of dormice in Europe alone during this period. During this time span, dormice represented the dominant group of rodents in Europe.

The earliest Asian dormice are known from the early Miocene, and the Miocene saw the emergence of several of the modern genera of living dormice. The diversity of dormice saw continual decline until the middle Pliocene, when there was again a period of speciation, mostly driven by the diversification of the African Graphiurus, which first appeared during the Pliocene, while the diversity of European dormice remained relatively low compared to their Miocene peak.

Several dormouse lineages experienced insular gigantism after being isolated on islands in the Mediterranean during the Pliocene and Pleistocene, the largest being the rabbit-sized Leithia of Sicily and Malta.

== Classification ==
The family consists of 29 extant species, in three subfamilies and (arguably) nine genera:

Cladogram of most living and recently extinct dormice genera based on mitochondrial DNA after Petrova et al. 2024:

- Gliridae (dormice)
  - - Graphiurinae
      Graphiurus (African dormice)
    - Glirinae
      - Glirulus (Japanese dormouse)
      - Glis (edible dormice)
  - Leithiinae
    - Muscardinus (hazel dormouse)
    - - - Myomimus (mouse-tailed dormice)
        - Selevinia (desert dormouse)
      - - Dryomys (woolly and forest dormice)
        - - Eliomys (garden dormice)
          - †Hypnomys (Balearic dormice)

Family Gliridae – Dormice

- Subfamily Glirinae
  - Genus Glirulus
    - Japanese dormouse, Glirulus japonicus
  - Genus Glis
    - European edible dormouse, Glis glis
    - Iranian edible dormouse, Glis persicus
- Subfamily Graphiurinae
  - Genus Graphiurus, African dormice
    - Angolan African dormouse, Graphiurus angolensis
    - Christy's dormouse, Graphiurus christyi
    - Walter Verheyen's African dormouse, Graphiurus walterverheyeni
    - Jentink's dormouse, Graphiurus crassicaudatus
    - Johnston's African dormouse, Graphiurus johnstoni
    - Kellen's dormouse, Graphiurus kelleni
    - Lorrain dormouse, Graphiurus lorraineus
    - Monard's dormouse, Graphiurus monardi
    - Nagtglas's African dormouse, Graphiurus nagtglasii
    - Rock dormouse, Graphiurus platyops
    - Silent dormouse, Graphiurus surdus
    - Small-eared dormouse, Graphiurus microtis
    - Spectacled dormouse, Graphiurus ocularis
    - Stone dormouse, Graphiurus rupicola
    - Woodland dormouse, Graphiurus murinus
- Subfamily Leithiinae
  - Genus Chaetocauda
    - Chinese dormouse, Chaetocauda sichuanensis
  - Genus Dryomys
    - Balochistan forest dormouse, Dryomys niethammeri
    - Forest dormouse, Dryomys nitedula
    - Woolly dormouse, Dryomys laniger
  - Genus Eliomys, garden dormice
    - Asian garden dormouse, Eliomys melanurus
    - Garden dormouse, Eliomys quercinus
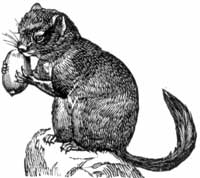
    - Maghreb garden dormouse, Eliomys munbyanus
  - Genus Hypnomys† (Balearic dormouse)
    - Majorcan giant dormouse, Hypnomys morphaeus†
    - Minorcan giant dormouse, Hypnomys mahonensis†
  - Genus Leithia†
    - Leithia cartei†
    - Maltese giant dormouse, Leithia melitensis†
  - Genus Muscardinus
    - Hazel dormouse, Muscardinus avellanarius
  - Genus Myomimus, mouse-tailed dormice
    - Masked mouse-tailed dormouse, Myomimus personatus
    - Roach's mouse-tailed dormouse, Myomimus roachi
    - Setzer's mouse-tailed dormouse, Myomimus setzeri
  - Genus Selevinia
    - Desert dormouse, Selevinia betpakdalaensis

† indicates an extinct species.

=== Fossil genera ===
- Eogliravus Hartenberger, 1971 - Eocene
- Bransatoglis Hugueney, 1967 - Oligocene
- Butseloglis Vianey-Liaud, 2003 - Oligocene
- Glamys Vianey-Liaud, 1989 - Oligocene
- Moissenetia Hugueney & Adrover, 1995 - Oligocene
- Oligodyromys Bahlo, 1975 - Oligocene
- Paraglis Baudelot, 1970 - Oligocene
- Glirudinus de Bruijn, 1966 - Oligocene to Miocene
- Microdyromys de Bruijn, 1966 - Oligocene to Miocene
- Peridyromys Stehlin & Schaub, 1951 - Oligocene to Miocene
- Vasseuromys Baudelot & de Bonis, 1966 - Oligocene to Miocene
- Carbomys Mein & Adrover, 1982 - Miocene
- Graphiurops Bachmayer & Wilson, 1980 - Miocene
- Miodyromys Kretzoi, 1943 - Early Miocene
- Praearmantomys de Bruijn, 1966 - Early Miocene
- Pseudodryomys de Bruijn, 1966 - Early Miocene
- Simplomys García-Paredes et al., 2009 - Early Miocene
- Seorsumuscardinus de Bruijn 1998 - Early Miocene
- Armantomys de Bruijn, 1966 - Early to Middle Miocene
- Prodryomys Mayr, 1979 - Early to Middle Miocene
- Tempestia van de Weerd, 1976 - Middle Miocene
- Ramys García-Moreno & Lopez-Martínez,1986 - Late Miocene
