= Myomimus =

Scientific classification
- Kingdom: Animalia
- Phylum: Chordata
- Class: Mammalia
- Order: Rodentia
- Family: Gliridae
- Subfamily: Leithiinae
- Genus: Myomimus; Ognev, 1924

Type species
- Myomimus personatus Ognev, 1924

Species
- M. personatus Ognev, 1924; M. roachi (Bate, 1937); M. setzeri Rossolimo, 1976

Synonyms
- Philistomys Bate, 1937

Genus of rodents

Myomimus is a genus of rodent in the family Gliridae. It contains the following species:

- Masked mouse-tailed dormouse (Myomimus personatus Ognev, 1924)
- Roach's mouse-tailed dormouse (Myomimus roachi (Bate, 1937))
- Setzer's mouse-tailed dormouse (Myomimus setzeri Rossolimo, 1976)
