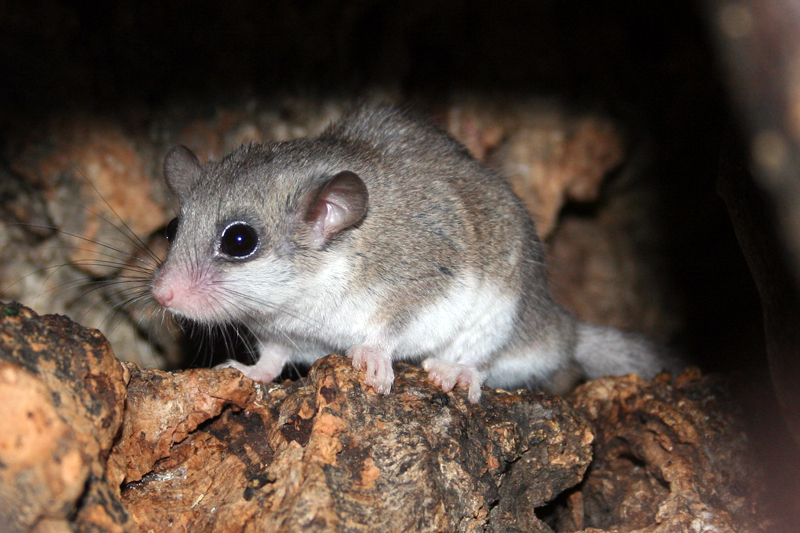
- Woodland dormouse (Graphiurus murinus)

Scientific classification
- Kingdom: Animalia
- Phylum: Chordata
- Class: Mammalia
- Order: Rodentia
- Family: Gliridae
- Subfamily: Graphiurinae; Winge, 1887
- Genus: Graphiurus; Smuts, 1832

Type species
- Sciurus ocularis A. Smith, 1829

Species
- Graphiurus angolensis Graphiurus christyi Graphiurus crassicaudatus Graphiurus johnstoni Graphiurus kelleni Graphiurus lorraineus Graphiurus microtis Graphiurus monardi Graphiurus murinus Graphiurus nagtglasii Graphiurus ocularis Graphiurus platyops Graphiurus rupicola Graphiurus surdus Graphiurus walterverheyeni

= Graphiurus =

African dormouse Temporal range: Late Pliocene to Recent

Genus of rodents

The African dormice (genus Graphiurus) are dormice that live throughout sub-Saharan Africa in a variety of habitats. They are very agile climbers and have bushy tails. They primarily eat invertebrates, with other components of their diet including small vertebrates, fruit, nuts and eggs. They represent the most diverse living genus of dormice, making up half of all living species.

== Species ==
Genus Graphiurus, African dormice

- Angolan African dormouse, Graphiurus angolensis
- Christy's dormouse, Graphiurus christyi
- Jentink's dormouse, Graphiurus crassicaudatus
- Johnston's African dormouse, Graphiurus johnstoni
- Kellen's dormouse, Graphiurus kelleni
- Lorrain dormouse, Graphiurus lorraineus
- Small-eared dormouse, Graphiurus microtis
- Monard's dormouse, Graphiurus monardi
- Woodland dormouse, Graphiurus murinus
- Nagtglas's African dormouse, Graphiurus nagtglasii
- Spectacled dormouse, Graphiurus ocularis
- Rock dormouse, Graphiurus platyops
- Stone dormouse, Graphiurus rupicola
- Silent dormouse, Graphiurus surdus
- Graphiurus walterverheyeni

== Gallery ==
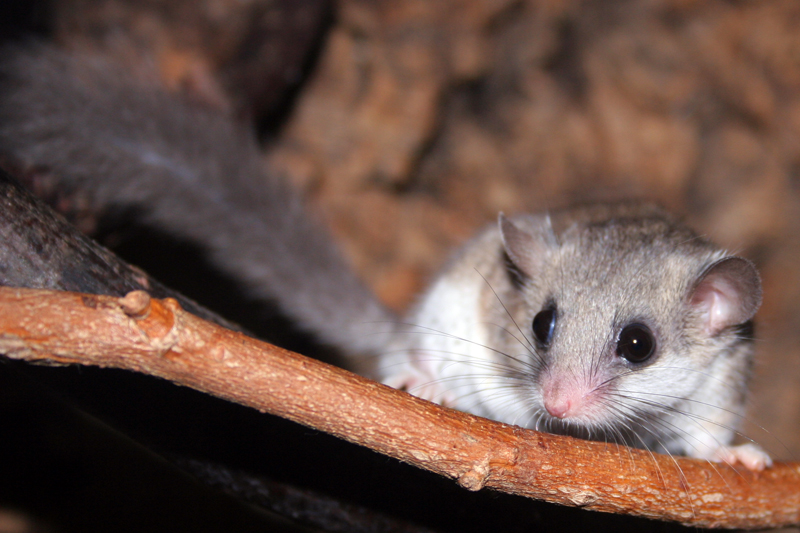
Graphiurus sp. (probably murinus) – male

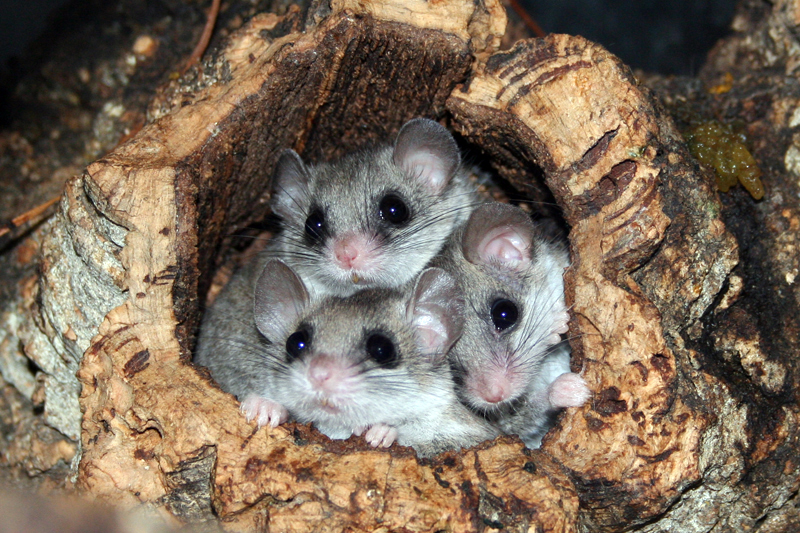
Graphiurus sp. (probably murinus) – three males in a knot-hole

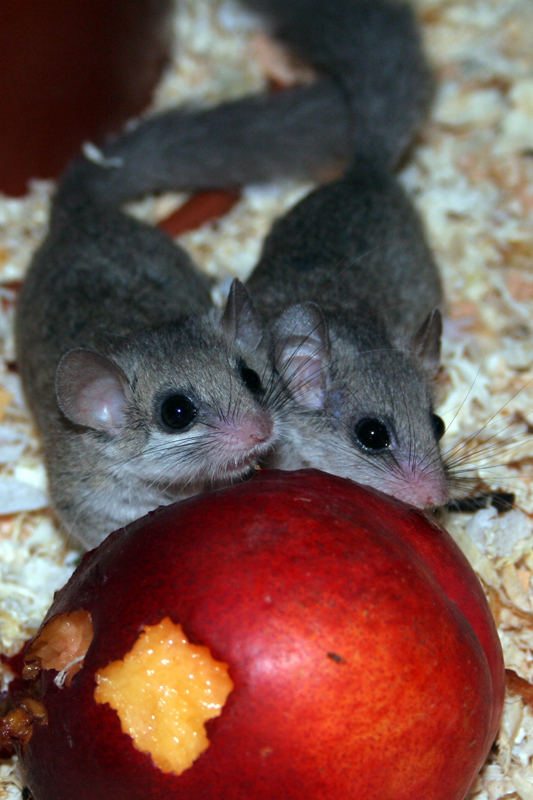
Graphiurus sp. (probably murinus) – two adults eating a nectarine
