= Guy Dollman =

British zoologist and taxonomist

Captain John Guy Dollman BA, FLS (4 September 1886 – 21 March 1942), known as Guy Dollman, was a British zoologist and taxonomist. Dollman's tree mouse and Dollman's vlei rat are named after him.

== Life and work ==
Elder son of the artist John Charles Dollman, Guy Dollman was born on 4 September 1886 and attended St Paul's School, winning a scholarship to study at St John's College, Cambridge. In February 1907, while still a student, he was employed by the Department of Zoology at the British Museum (Natural History), where he spent most of his working life as Assistant Keeper of Mammals.

In 1912, on an expedition to Vietnam, he discovered and named the Tonkin snub-nosed langur. He joined the British Army in 1915, and obtained a commission in the 19th London Regiment. He did not see active service abroad during World War I as he was injured in a bomb accident. He returned to the museum in 1919. He was a member of the panel of advisers to the British delegation to the 1933 International Conference for the Preservation of the Flora and Fauna of Africa, said to have been "the high point of institutionalised global nature protection before the Second World War", and, according to his obituary in The Times, Dollman "had a decisive voice on the animal species to be scheduled for total or partial protection". He travelled and wrote extensively with Walter Rothschild; their publications included New mammals from Dutch New Guinea (1932) and a study of tree kangaroos The Genus Dendrolagus (1936). He was also an accomplished artist, exhibiting pictures at the Royal Academy, and illustrated many of his own scientific writings.

Dollman died on 21 March 1942, aged 65.

== Works ==
- A History of British Mammals; Gerald Edwin Hamilton Barrett-Hamilton, Guy Dollman, Martin Alister Campbell Hinton, and Edward Adrian Wilson (1910) ASIN: B0014IP87W
- A new Elephant Shrew from the Island of Zanzibar; The Annals and Magazine of Natural History, Vol. X: Eighth series 1912, Pages: 130–131, (1912)
- A new Snub-nosed Monkey; The Proceedings of the Zoological Society of London, Pages: 503–504, (1912)
- On the African Shrews belonging to the Genus Crocidura; The Annals and Magazine of Natural History, 8th series, vol.16 (1915)
- Catalogue of the Selous Collection of Big Game in the British Museum (Natural History); Longmans, Green and Co., (1921) available online
- Guide to the Specimens of the Horse Family (Equidæ) Exhibited in the Department of Zoology, British Museum (Natural History), 2nd ed.; Lydekker, Richard & Dollman, Guy; published by order of the Trustees (1922)
- Records of Big Game: With Their Distribution, Characteristics, Dimensions, Weights, and Horn & Tusk Measurements by Rowland Ward, John Guy Dollman, J. B. Burlace; Rowland Ward Ltd, (1922)
- Horn Measurements and Weights of the Great Game of the World, &c. by Rowland Ward, J B Burlace, John Guy Dollman (1892)
- The Game Animals of India, Burma, Malaya, and Tibet 2nd ed. by Richard Lydekker, revised by John Guy Dollman; published by Ward, (1924)
- The Game Animals of Africa by Richard Lydekker, John Guy Dollman published by R. Ward, (1926) 2nd ed. (revised by Dollman), London
- A new race of Arabian Gazelle. Proc. Zool. Soc. London (1927)
- Game animals of the Empire (1932) ASIN: B001855K8S
- Mammals collected by Lord Cranbrook and Captain F. Kingdon Ward in Upper Burma. Proceedings of the Linnean Society of London (1932)
- New mammals from Dutch New Guinea. Abstracts of the Proceedings of the Zoological Society of London 353,13-16; Rothschild, Lord Walter & Dollman, G. (1932).
- On mammals collected in Dutch New Guinea by Mr. F. Shaw Mayer in 1930. Rothschild, Lord Walter & Dollman, G. Proceedings of the Zoological Society of London (1932), 211–219. (1933).
- Rowland Ward's Records of Big Game edited by J. B. Burlace, Guy Dollman; published by Rowland Ward, 10th ed. (1935) ASIN: B000Q61X36
- The Genus Dendrolagus (Tree Kangaroos); Rothschild, Walter and Dollman, Guy, Transactions of the Zoological Society of London, 21, 477-551 (1936).
- African Antelopes; Supplement to the Journal of the Royal African Society Vol. XXXV, No. CXLI; Macmillan and co, (1936) ASIN: B000WXIB38
- The Basenji Dog. Journal of the Royal African Society. 36(CXLII): 148-149 (1937)
