= List of bathyergids =

Species in mammal family Bathyergidae

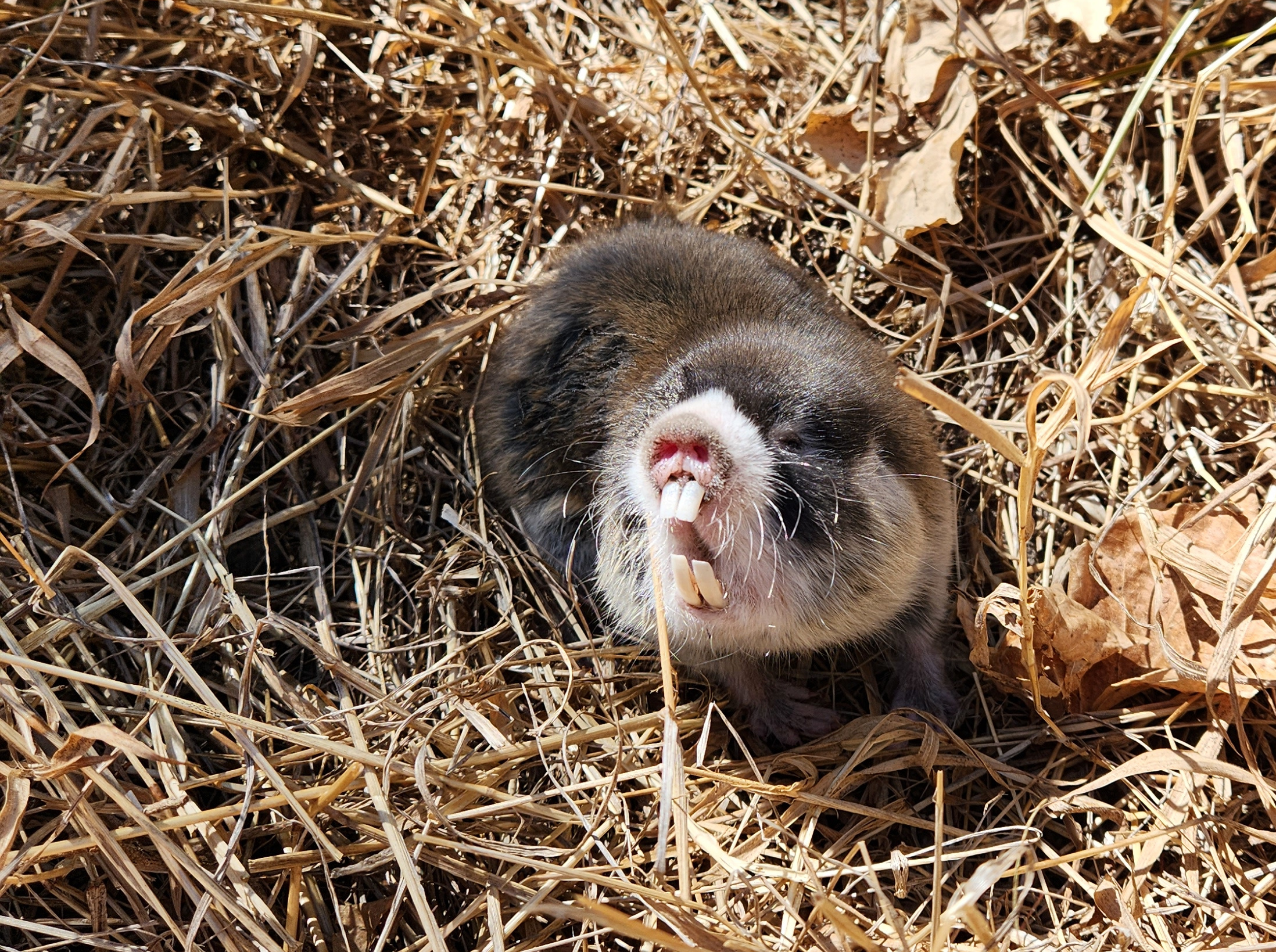
Cape mole-rat (Georychus capensis)

Bathyergidae is a family of fossorial mammals in the order Rodentia and part of the Phiomorpha parvorder. Members of this family are called bathyergids, blesmols, or mole-rats. They are found in Sub-Saharan Africa, primarily in shrublands, grasslands, and savannas, though some species can be found in deserts or forests. They range in size from Caroline's mole-rat, at 8 cm (3 in) plus a 1 cm (0.4 in) tail, to the Cape dune mole-rat, at 35 cm (14 in) plus a 4 cm (2 in) tail. Bathyergids are omnivores, and primarily eat roots, bulbs, and tubers, as well as earthworms and insects. Almost no bathyergids have population estimates, but the Hanang mole-rat is categorized as endangered with a population as low as 100.

The twenty-one extant species of Bathyergidae are divided into five genera, which range in size from one to thirteen species. Several extinct prehistoric bathyergid species have been discovered, though due to ongoing research and discoveries, the exact number and categorization is not fixed.

== Conventions ==
IUCN Red List categories
Conservation status
- EX: Extinct (0 species)
- EW: Extinct in the wild (0 species)
- CR: Critically endangered (0 species)
- EN: Endangered (1 species)
- VU: Vulnerable (1 species)
- NT: Near threatened (0 species)
- LC: Least concern (15 species)

Other categories
- DD: Data deficient (4 species)
- NE: Not evaluated (0 species)

The author citation for the species or genus is given after the scientific name; parentheses around the author citation indicate that this was not the original taxonomic placement. Conservation status codes listed follow the International Union for Conservation of Nature (IUCN) Red List of Threatened Species. Range maps are provided wherever possible; if a range map is not available, a description of the bathyergid's range is provided. Ranges are based on the IUCN Red List for that species unless otherwise noted.

== Classification ==
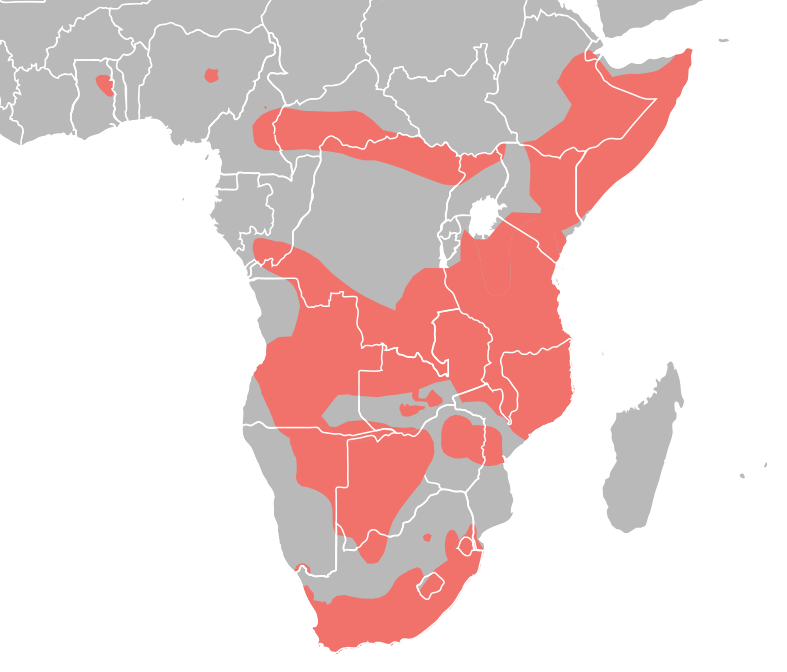
Bathyergidae distribution

Bathyergidae is a family consisting of twenty-one extant species in five genera. This does not include hybrid species or extinct prehistoric species.

Family Bathyergidae

- Genus Bathyergus (dune mole-rats): two species
- Genus Cryptomys (common mole-rats): four species
- Genus Fukomys (tropical mole-rats): thirteen species
- Genus Georychus (Cape mole-rat): one species
- Genus Heliophobius (silvery mole-rat): one species

- Bathyergidae
  - Heliophobius
  - - - Bathyergus
      - Georychus
    - - Cryptomys
      - Fukomys

== Bathyergids ==
The following classification is based on the taxonomy described by the reference work Mammal Species of the World (2005), with augmentation by generally accepted proposals made since using molecular phylogenetic analysis, as supported by both the IUCN and the American Society of Mammalogists.

Genus Bathyergus – Illiger, 1811 – two species
Common name	Scientific name and subspecies	Range	Size and ecology	IUCN status and estimated population
Cape dune mole-rat	B. suillus (Schreber, 1782)	South Africa (in red)	Size: 27–35 cm (11–14 in) long, plus 3–4 cm (1–2 in) tail Habitat: Desert Diet: Bulbs and fleshy roots	LC Unknown
Namaqua dune mole-rat	B. janetta Thomas & Schwann, 1904	South Africa and Namibia (in blue)	Size: 17–23 cm (7–9 in) long, plus 4–6 cm (2 in) tail Habitat: Shrubland Diet: Bulbs and fleshy roots	LC Unknown

Genus Cryptomys – Gray, 1864 – four species
Common name	Scientific name and subspecies	Range	Size and ecology	IUCN status and estimated population
Common mole-rat	C. hottentotus (Lesson, 1825)	South Africa (in blue)	Size: Unknown Habitat: Shrubland and grassland Diet: Roots, bulbs, tubers, and aloe leaves, as well as earthworms and insects	LC Unknown
Highveld mole-rat	C. pretoriae (Roberts, 1913)	South Africa (in green)	Size: About 14 cm (6 in) long, plus about 2 cm (1 in) tail Habitat: Shrubland and grassland Diet: Roots, bulbs, tubers, and aloe leaves, as well as earthworms and insects	LC Unknown
Mahali mole-rat	C. mahali (Roberts, 1913)	South Africa (in brown, in box)	Size: 13–15 cm (5–6 in) long, plus 1–3 cm (0.4–1.2 in) tail Habitat: Shrubland and grassland Diet: Roots, bulbs, tubers, and aloe leaves, as well as earthworms and insects	LC Unknown
Natal mole-rat	C. natalensis (Roberts, 1913)	Southern Africa (in red)	Size: 15–18 cm (6–7 in) long, plus 2–3 cm (1 in) tail Habitat: Shrubland and grassland Diet: Roots, bulbs, tubers, and aloe leaves, as well as earthworms and insects	LC Unknown

Genus Fukomys – Kock, Ingram, Frabotta, Honeycutt, & Burda, 2006 – thirteen species
Common name	Scientific name and subspecies	Range	Size and ecology	IUCN status and estimated population
Ansell's mole-rat	F. anselli (Burda, Zima, Scharff, Macholán, & Kawalika, 1999)	Zambia	Size: 10–14 cm (4–6 in) long, plus 1–3 cm (0.4–1.2 in) tail Habitat: Savanna Diet: Roots, bulbs, tubers, and aloe leaves, as well as earthworms and insects	LC Unknown
Bocage's mole-rat	F. bocagei (De Winton, 1897)	Southwestern Africa	Size: 14–17 cm (6–7 in) long, plus 0.5–2 cm (0.2–0.8 in) tail Habitat: Savanna, shrubland, and grassland Diet: Roots, bulbs, tubers, and aloe leaves, as well as earthworms and insects	LC Unknown
Caroline's mole-rat	F. vandewoestijneae Van Daele, Blondé, Stjernstedt, & Adriaens, 2013	South-central Africa	Size: 8–15 cm (3–6 in) long, plus 1–3 cm (0.4–1.2 in) tail Habitat: Forest and grassland Diet: Roots, bulbs, tubers, and aloe leaves, as well as earthworms and insects	DD Unknown
Damaraland mole-rat	F. damarensis (Ogilby, 1838)	Southern Africa	Size: 15–18 cm (6–7 in) long, plus 2–3 cm (1 in) tail Habitat: Shrubland and grassland Diet: Roots, bulbs, tubers, and aloe leaves, as well as earthworms and insects	LC Unknown
Ghana mole-rat	F. zechi Matschie, 1900	Ghana	Size: 12–23 cm (5–9 in) long, plus about 2 cm (1 in) tail Habitat: Savanna, shrubland, and grassland Diet: Roots, bulbs, tubers, and aloe leaves, as well as earthworms and insects	LC Unknown
Hanang mole-rat	F. hanangensis Faulkes, Mgode, Archer, & Bennett, 2017	Tanzania	Size: About 11 cm (4 in) long, plus about 1 cm (0 in) tail Habitat: Grassland Diet: Roots, bulbs, tubers, and aloe leaves, as well as earthworms and insects	EN 100–200
Kafue mole-rat	F. kafuensis (Burda, Zima, Scharff, Macholán, & Kawalika, 1999)	Zambia	Size: 9–13 cm (4–5 in) long, plus 1–2 cm (0–1 in) tail Habitat: Savanna Diet: Roots, bulbs, tubers, and aloe leaves, as well as earthworms and insects	VU Unknown
Livingstone's mole-rat	F. livingstoni Faulkes, Mgode, Archer, & Bennett, 2017	Tanzania	Size: About 12 cm (5 in) long, plus about 1 cm (0.4 in) tail Habitat: Unknown Diet: Roots, bulbs, tubers, and aloe leaves, as well as earthworms and insects	DD Unknown
Mashona mole-rat	F. darlingi (Thomas, 1895)	Zimbabwe and Mozambique	Size: 12–17 cm (5–7 in) long, plus 0.5–2 cm (0.2–0.8 in) tail Habitat: Shrubland and grassland Diet: Roots, bulbs, tubers, and aloe leaves, as well as earthworms and insects	LC Unknown
Mechow's mole-rat	F. mechowi (Peters, 1881)	South-central Africa	Size: 13–26 cm (5–10 in) long, plus 2–4 cm (1–2 in) tail Habitat: Savanna, shrubland, and grassland Diet: Roots, bulbs, tubers, and aloe leaves, as well as earthworms and insects	LC Unknown
Nigerian mole-rat	F. foxi (Thomas, 1911)	Nigeria and Cameroon	Size: 16–20 cm (6–8 in) long, plus 1–3 cm (0.4–1.2 in) tail Habitat: Grassland Diet: Roots, bulbs, tubers, and aloe leaves, as well as earthworms and insects	DD Unknown
Ochre mole-rat	F. ochraceocinereus (Heuglin, 1864)	Central Africa	Size: 15–20 cm (6–8 in) long, plus 1–3 cm (0.4–1.2 in) tail Habitat: Savanna, shrubland, and grassland Diet: Roots, bulbs, tubers, and aloe leaves, as well as earthworms and insects	LC Unknown
Somali striped mole-rat	F. ilariae Gippoliti & Amori, 2011	Somalia	Size: About 12 cm (5 in) long, plus tail Habitat: Shrubland Diet: Roots, bulbs, tubers, and aloe leaves, as well as earthworms and insects	DD Unknown

Genus Georychus – Illiger, 1811 – one species
Common name	Scientific name and subspecies	Range	Size and ecology	IUCN status and estimated population
Cape mole-rat	G. capensis (Pallas, 1778)	South Africa and Lesotho	Size: 8–23 cm (3–9 in) long, plus 1–3 cm (0.4–1.2 in) tail Habitat: Shrubland and forest Diet: Tubers, roots, and bulbs	LC Unknown

Genus Heliophobius – Peters, 1846 – one species
Common name	Scientific name and subspecies	Range	Size and ecology	IUCN status and estimated population
Silvery mole-rat	H. argenteocinereus Peters, 1846	Southeastern Africa	Size: 13–20 cm (5–8 in) long, plus 0.5–2 cm (0.2–0.8 in) tail Habitat: Savanna, shrubland, grassland, and caves Diet: Tubers and bulbs	LC Unknown

== Sources ==
- Chernasky, Amy; Motis, Anna; Burgin, Connor, eds. (2023). All the Mammals of the World. Lynx Nature Books. ISBN 978-84-16728-66-4.
- Nowak, Ronald M. (1999). Walker's Mammals of the World. Vol. 2 (6th ed.). Johns Hopkins University Press. ISBN 978-0-8018-5789-8.
- Woods, Charles A.; Kilpatrick, C. William (2005). Wilson, Don E.; Reeder, DeeAnn M. (eds.). Mammal Species of the World. Vol. 2 (3rd ed.). Johns Hopkins University Press. ISBN 978-0-8018-8221-0.
