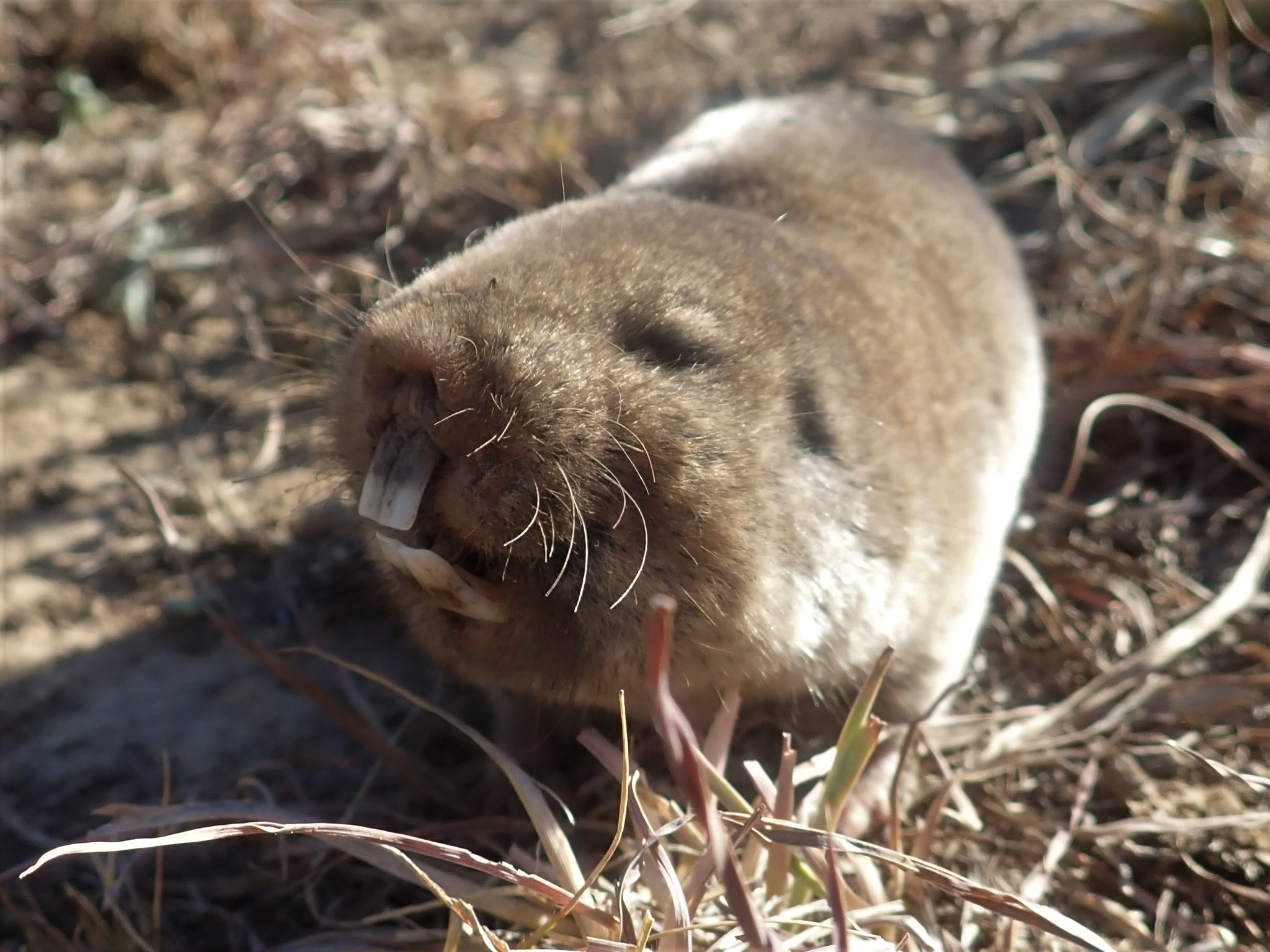
- Cryptomys hottentotus

Scientific classification
- Kingdom: Animalia
- Phylum: Chordata
- Class: Mammalia
- Infraclass: Placentalia
- Order: Rodentia
- Family: Bathyergidae
- Genus: Cryptomys; J. E. Gray, 1864

Type species
- Georychus holosericeus Wagner, 1842 (= Bathyergus hottentotus Lesson, 1826)

Species
- Cryptomys hottentotus Cryptomys mahali Cryptomys natalensis Cryptomys nimrodi Cryptomys pretoriae
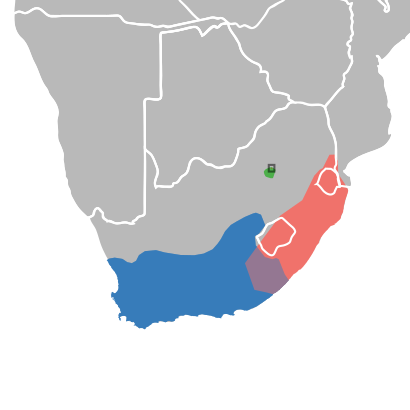
- Cryptomys distribution.png C. natalensis in red, C. hottentotus in blue, C. pretoriae in green, C. mahali in brown (in box)

= Cryptomys =

Cryptomys Temporal range: Early Pliocene to Recent

Genus of rodents

Cryptomys is the genus of mole-rats, endemic to Africa. Most of the species formerly placed in this genus were moved to the genus Fukomys in 2006.

== Species ==
The species currently included in this genus are:

- Cryptomys hottentotus (Lesson, 1826)
- Cryptomys mahali (Roberts, 1913)
- Cryptomys natalensis (Roberts, 1913)
- Cryptomys nimrodi (de Winton, 1896)
- Cryptomys pretoriae (Roberts, 1913)

The following species were formerly in Cryptomys but later moved to the genus Fukomys:

- Cryptomys amatus (Wroughton, 1907)
- Cryptomys anselli (Burda, Zima, Scharff, Macholán & Kawalika, 1999)
- Cryptomys bocagei (de Winton, 1897)
- Cryptomys damarensis (Ogilby, 1838)
- Cryptomys darlingi (Thomas, 1895)
- Cryptomys foxi (Thomas, 1911)
- Cryptomys kafuensis (Burda, Zima, Scharff, Macholán & Kawalika, 1999)
- Cryptomys mechowi (Peters, 1881)
- Cryptomys ochraceocinereus (Heuglin, 1864)
- Cryptomys zechi (Matschie, 1900)
