= List of mole-rats =

List of mole-rats can refer to:

- List of bathyergids, species in the rodent family Bathyergidae, referred to as blesmols or mole-rats
- List of spalacids, species in the rodent family Spalacidae, which includes species referred to as mole-rats or blind mole-rats as well as zokors and bamboo rats
