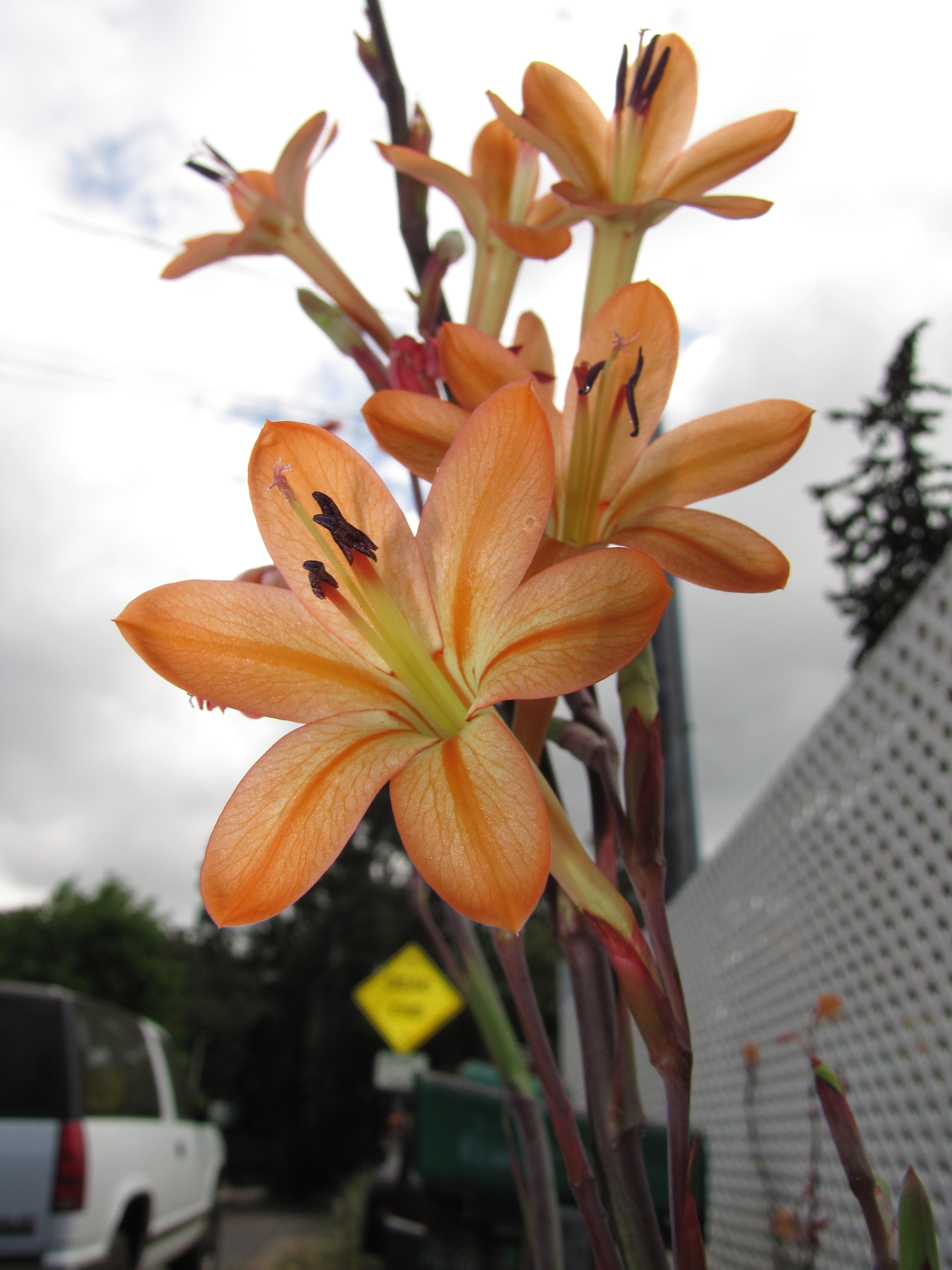

Scientific classification
- Kingdom: Plantae
- Clade: Tracheophytes
- Clade: Angiosperms
- Clade: Monocots
- Order: Asparagales
- Family: Iridaceae
- Genus: Watsonia
- Species: W. meriana

Binomial name
- Watsonia meriana (L.) Mill.

Synonyms
- Watsonia bulbillifera

= Watsonia meriana =

Species of flowering plant

Watsonia meriana is a species of flowering plant in the family Iridaceae known by the common name bulbil bugle-lily. It is one of several Watsonia species known as wild watsonia. It is native to the Cape Provinces of South Africa, but it is well known as an ornamental plant grown in gardens for its showy spikes of flowers, and is an invasive species in areas where it has escaped cultivation.

== Description ==
It is a perennial herb growing from a fibrous-coated corm and growing to a maximum height well over one meter when in flower, sometimes reaching two meters. Each corm produces three or four erect, lance-shaped leaves that measure up to 60 centimeters long by 6 wide. They have thickened midribs and margins. The inflorescence is an open spike of 8 to 25 flowers which may be in shades of orange to reddish or purplish. The flower is up to 8 centimeters long, with a long, tubular throat and spreading tepals.

The flowers sometimes yield capsule fruits which contain seed, but the plant often reproduces via bulbils (strictly speaking, cormlets) that form in clusters in the axils of bracts at nodes along the peduncle. The bulbils can sprout if dropped into the soil, sometimes forming dense colonies, as can sections of corm that are chopped and dispersed by plowing or by non-intensive feeding by root-eating animals. In its native habitat, the plant is valuable as food for local mole-rats (Cryptomys and Georychus species), and for Cape porcupines (Hystrix africaeaustralis)

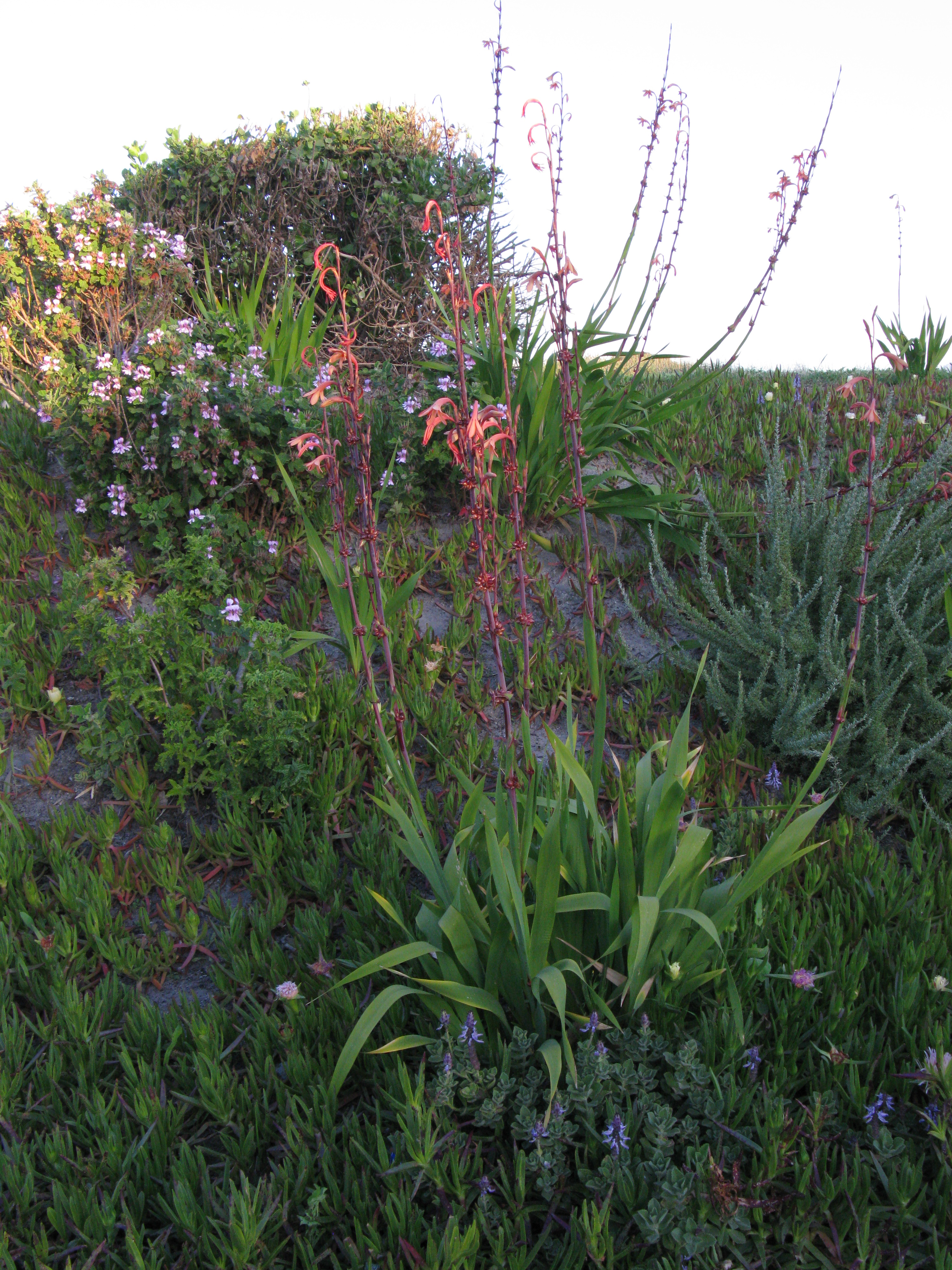
Near end of flowering showing cormlets on inflorescence

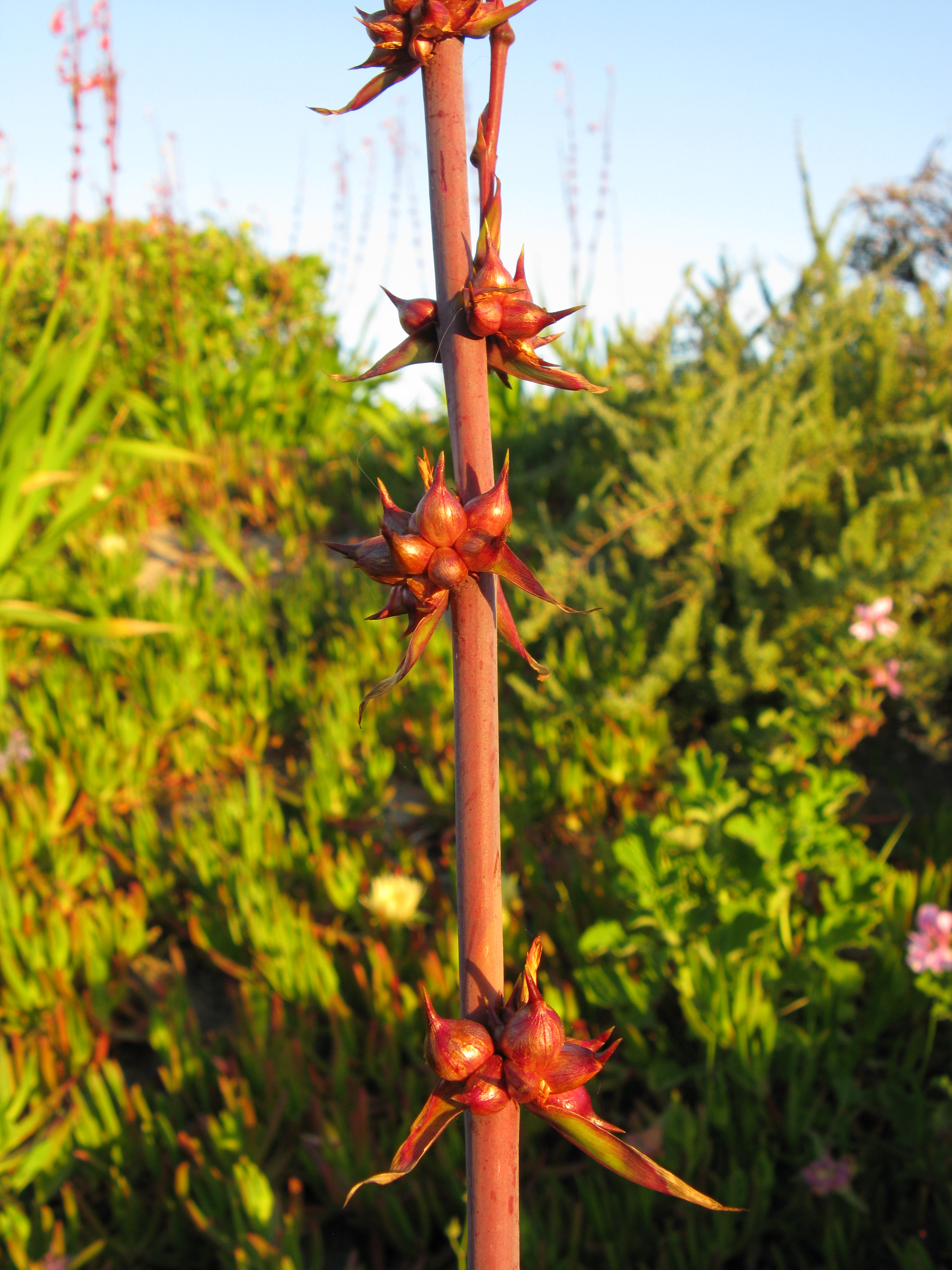
Detail of cormlets on inflorescence

Like some other Watsonia species, in suitable climates, W. meriana can take hold in the wild as a weedy introduced species. It has become habituated along the southern coast of Australia, in New Zealand, on the North Coast of California, on the west coast of Portugal, in Madeira and in Galicia. The plant forms dense colonies that crowd other plant species, and is generally avoided by wildlife as a food source in areas where it is not native.
