= Fukomys hanangensis =

Scientific classification
- Kingdom: Animalia
- Phylum: Chordata
- Class: Mammalia
- Order: Rodentia
- Family: Bathyergidae
- Genus: Fukomys
- Species: F. hanangensis

Binomial name
- Fukomys hanangensis Faulkes, Mgode, Archer & Bennett, 2017

Species of mole rat

The Hanang mole-rat (Fukomys hanangensis) is a species of mole rat. It was discovered in 2017 in Tanzania.
