= Micklem's mole-rat =

Micklem's mole rat

Scientific classification
- Kingdom: Animalia
- Phylum: Chordata
- Class: Mammalia
- Infraclass: Placentalia
- Order: Rodentia
- Family: Bathyergidae
- Genus: Fukomys
- Species: F. micklemi

Binomial name
- Fukomys micklemi (Chubb, 1909)

Species of rodent

The Micklem's mole-rat (Fukomys micklemi) is a species of rodent in the family Bathyergidae. It is found in Zambia. It is a subterranean species of chisel tooth diggers.

It is a social species, and this has been suggested to account for its more diverse and extensive vocal repertoire than has been observed in eusocial species of Bathyergidae. As a result of DNA analysis it has been suggested that the species may need to be subdivided.
