= Fukomys vandewoestijneae =

Caroline's mole-rat

Scientific classification
- Kingdom: Animalia
- Phylum: Chordata
- Class: Mammalia
- Order: Rodentia
- Family: Bathyergidae
- Genus: Fukomys
- Species: F. vandewoestijneae

Binomial name
- Fukomys vandewoestijneae Van Daele, Blondé, Stjernstedt, Adriaens, 2013

Species of rodent

Fukomys vandewoestijneae or Caroline's mole-rat was first noticed in 2002 by a research team from the University of Ghent. This new species, distinguished by a distinctive skull shape, was recently described by Paul Van Daele and his team in Zootaxa while DNA and chromosome tests confirmed its novelty. The new species was named after Van Daele's late wife, Caroline Van De Woestijne, who was a member of the research team and died of malaria while in Africa.

The species was found in the Ikelenge Pedicle between the Sakeji and Zambezi rivers, a region shared by Zambia, the Democratic Republic of Congo (DRC) and Angola. Although the area has not been well-researched it is considered to harbour a great number of endemic species. To date 28 endemic species have come to light: one amphibian, five mammals, three butterflies, and 19 dragonflies. The region comprises gallery forests adjacent to rivers and wetlands, and woodlands where miombo trees are dominant, the habitat of the new mole rat. These forests, as with others all over the world, are under threat.
