= Fukomys livingstoni =

Conservation status
- Data Deficient (IUCN 3.1)

Scientific classification
- Kingdom: Animalia
- Phylum: Chordata
- Class: Mammalia
- Order: Rodentia
- Family: Bathyergidae
- Genus: Fukomys
- Species: F. livingstoni

Binomial name
- Fukomys livingstoni Faukes, Mgode, Archer & Bennett, 2017

Species of mole rat

Fukomys livingstoni is a species of mole rat that can be found in Africa.

It is named after Dr David Livingstone.
