= Zambian mole-rat =

Scientific classification
- Domain: Eukaryota
- Kingdom: Animalia
- Phylum: Chordata
- Class: Mammalia
- Order: Rodentia
- Family: Bathyergidae
- Genus: Fukomys
- Species: F. amatus

Binomial name
- Fukomys amatus (Wroughton, 1907)

Synonyms
- Cryptomys hottentotus amatus

Species of rodent

The Zambian mole-rat (Fukomys amatus) is a species of rodent in the family Bathyergidae. It is found in Zambia and the Democratic Republic of the Congo. It was formerly considered a subspecies of Cryptomys hottentotus.
