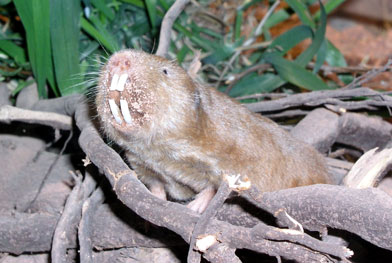
- Fukomys anselli

Scientific classification
- Kingdom: Animalia
- Phylum: Chordata
- Class: Mammalia
- Infraclass: Placentalia
- Order: Rodentia
- Family: Bathyergidae
- Genus: Fukomys; Kock et al., 2006

Type species
- Bathyergus damarensis Ogilby, 1838

Species
- See text
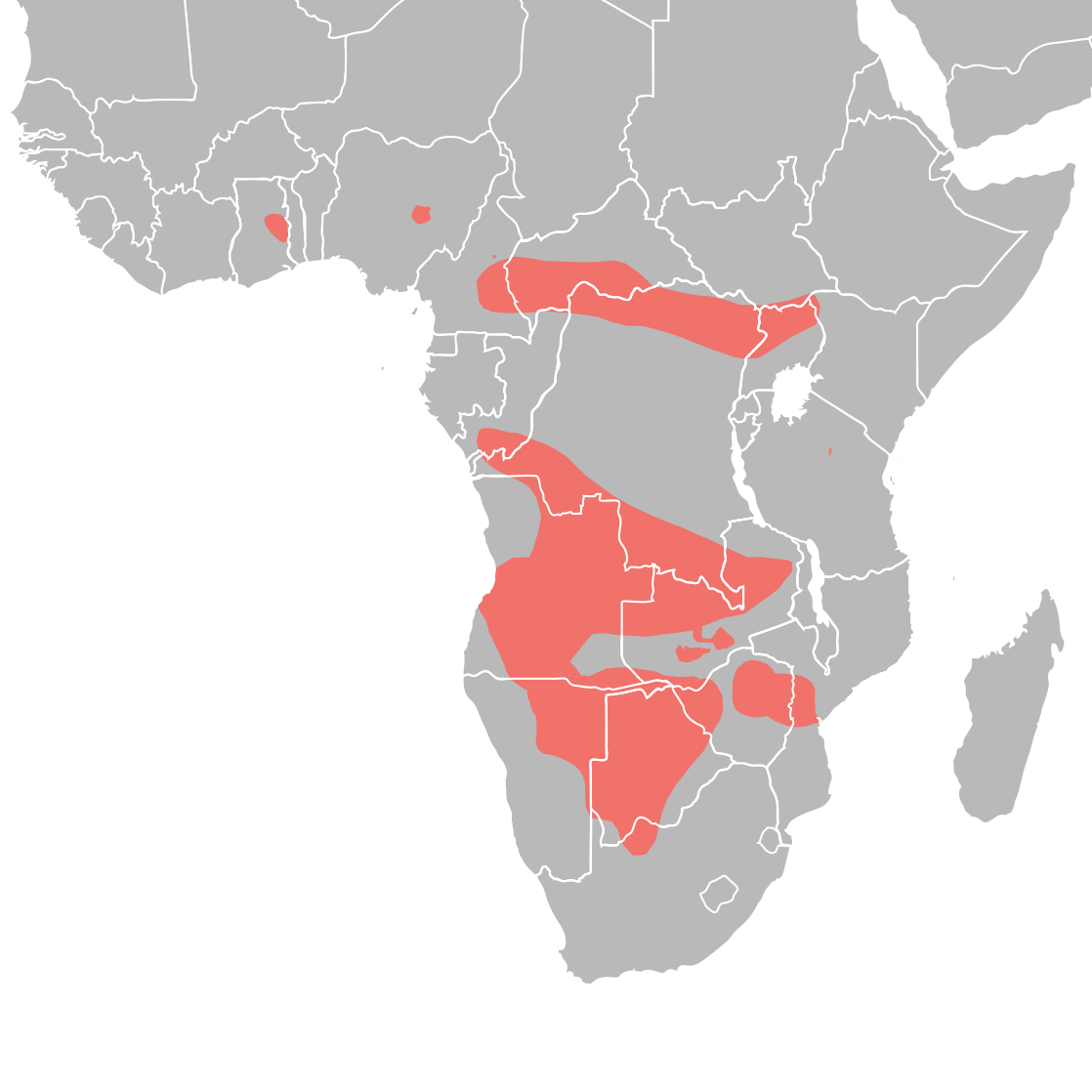
- Fukomys distribution

= Fukomys =

Fukomys Temporal range: Early Pliocene to Recent

Genus of rodents

Fukomys is a genus described in 2006 of common mole-rats, containing several species that were formerly placed in the genus Cryptomys; its species are endemic to Africa. The species contained in the genus includes:

- Fukomys amatus - Zambian mole-rat
- Fukomys anselli - Ansell's mole-rat
- Fukomys bocagei - Bocage's mole-rat
- Fukomys damarensis - Damaraland mole-rat
- Fukomys darlingi - Mashona mole-rat
- Fukomys foxi - Nigerian mole-rat
- Fukomys hanangensis - Hanang mole-rat
- Fukomys ilariae - Somali striped mole rat
- Fukomys kafuensis - Kafue mole-rat
- Fukomys livingstoni - Livingstone's mole-rat
- Fukomys mechowii - Mechow's mole-rat
- Fukomys micklemi - Micklem's mole-rat
- Fukomys occlusus
- Fukomys ochraceocinereus - Ochre mole-rat
- Fukomys vandewoestijneae - Caroline's mole rat
- Fukomys whytei - Whyte's mole-rat
- Fukomys zechi - Ghana mole-rat
