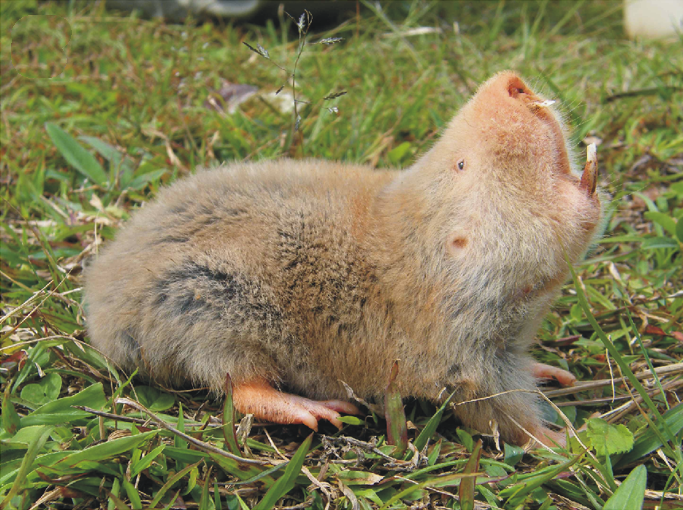

Conservation status
- Least Concern (IUCN 3.1)

Scientific classification
- Kingdom: Animalia
- Phylum: Chordata
- Class: Mammalia
- Order: Rodentia
- Family: Bathyergidae
- Genus: Heliophobius; Peters, 1846
- Species: H. argenteocinereus

Binomial name
- Heliophobius argenteocinereus Peters, 1846
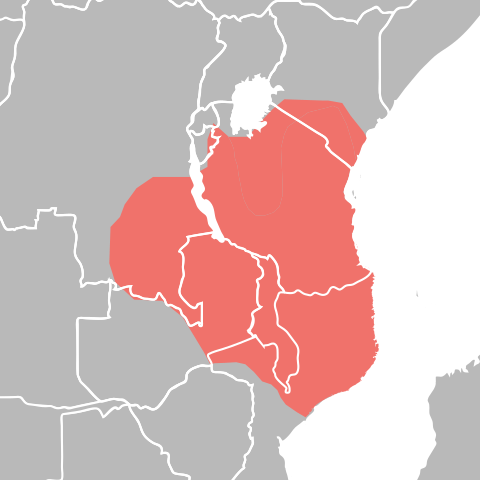
- Heliophobius argenteocinereus distribution

= Silvery mole-rat =

Species of rodent

The silvery mole-rat, silvery blesmol, or silky mole-rat (Heliophobius argenteocinereus) is a species of mole-rat of East Africa which occurs in southern Kenya, Tanzania, southeastern Democratic Republic of Congo, Mozambique and Malawi. Solitary and aggressive, little is known about its ecology or behavior. It is monotypic in the genus Heliophobius. A common species, the International Union for Conservation of Nature has rated it as being of "least concern".

== Description ==
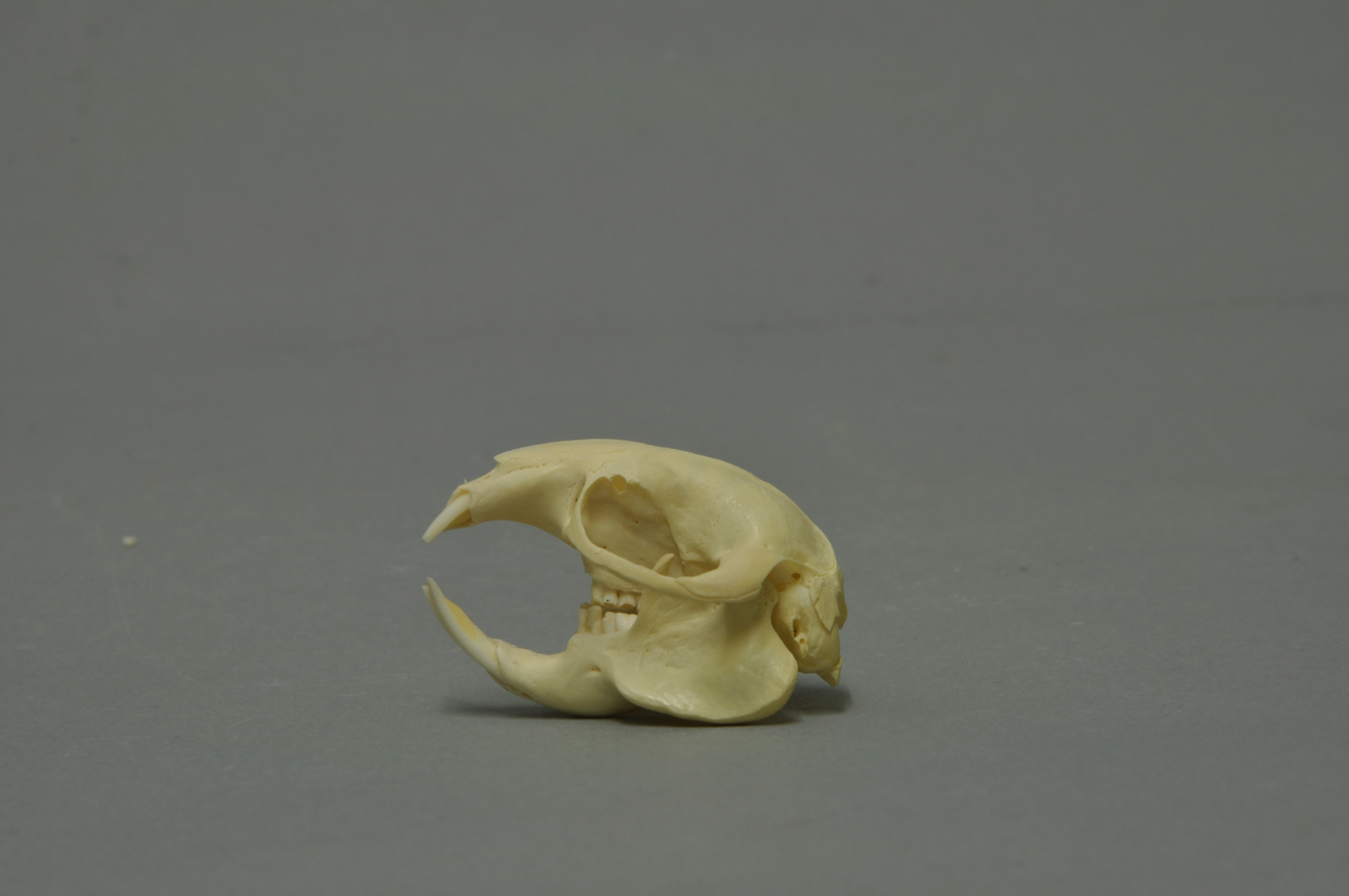
Skull of a silvery mole-rat

This is a medium-sized mole-rat with soft, silky silvery-grey fur. The head is paler around the eyes, the sides of the face and the snout, and some individuals have a small white patch on the forehead. The long, slightly-curved incisors lie outside the lips. The upper parts of head and body are silvery-grey to tan, the fur being up to 25 mm (1 in) in length, and the underparts are pale silvery-grey. The feet and claws are not enlarged for digging and are pale, with a fringe of stiff hairs around the margin of the digits. The tail is a pale colour and is less than 10% of the head-and-body length. In Malawi, the size of males is about 15% larger than females, but elsewhere there is little sexual dimorphism.

== Distribution and habitat ==
The silvery mole-rat is native to Kenya, Tanzania, the Democratic Republic of Congo, Mozambique and Malawi in East Africa. Its typical habitat is open grassy woodland, including Combretum-Brachystegium woodland, as well as sub-montane grassland and rocky slopes at altitudes of up to 2,200 m (7,220 ft). It is adaptable as to soil types, both sandy and black "cotton" soils being acceptable.

== Ecology ==
Like other mole-rats, the species lives underground in a burrow which it digs with its incisor teeth. Like most other mole-rats, it is solitary. The diet is vegetarian and consists largely of roots, bulbs and corms, especially the roots of the leguminous Dolichos spp. and Vigna spp., with Vigna being a key foodstuff that attracts it to an area. Agricultural fields are sometimes invaded and rootcrops are eaten. They engage in coprophagy, consuming up to twelve faecal pellets at a time. Their foodstuffs are gathered underground by means of a long feeding passage running parallel with the surface and extending in one instance for over 100 m (300 ft). Rather deeper in the ground, at about 30 cm (12 in), is a nesting chamber containing a hollow ball of grasses, corn husks and root skins. Deeper still, at about 50 cm (20 in), is a bolt hole for escaping from danger. There are also food-storage chambers, and blind burrows which are used as latrines.

Silvery mole-rats are territorial and fairly aggressive, driving off other mole-rats. When cornered, they adopt a defensive stance with head thrown back and incisors exposed. Breeding takes place at different times of year in different parts of the range. Courtship can be quite vocal and is initiated by the male, which follows the female about, sniffing at her genital region. When he is accepted, they face each other and lock teeth or nibble each other gently with their elongated incisors before copulating. The gestation period is between 87 and 101 days, and the litter size is usually between two and five.
