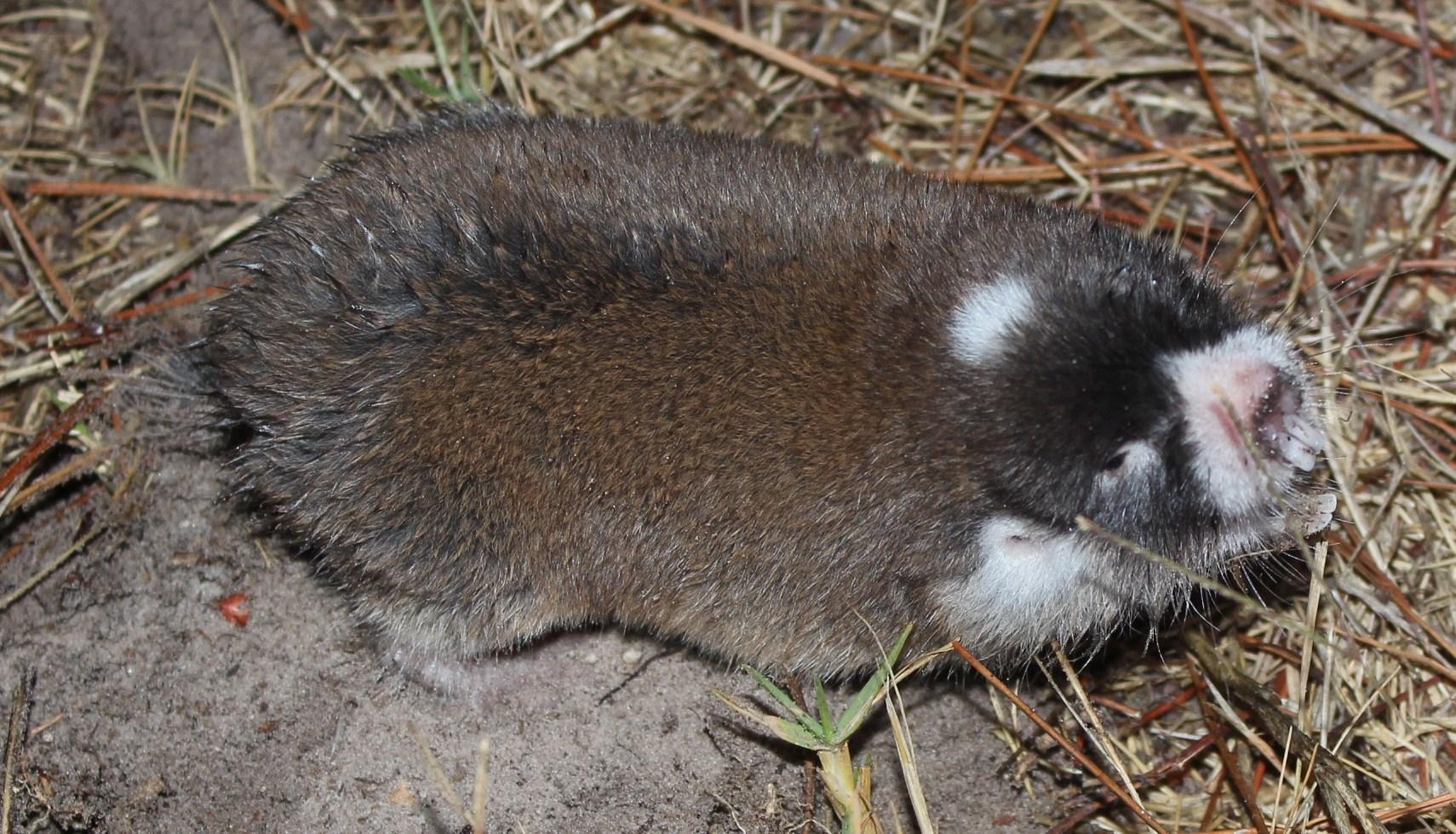

Conservation status
- Least Concern (IUCN 3.1)

Scientific classification
- Kingdom: Animalia
- Phylum: Chordata
- Class: Mammalia
- Order: Rodentia
- Family: Bathyergidae
- Genus: Georychus; Illiger, 1811
- Species: G. capensis

Binomial name
- Georychus capensis (Pallas, 1778)
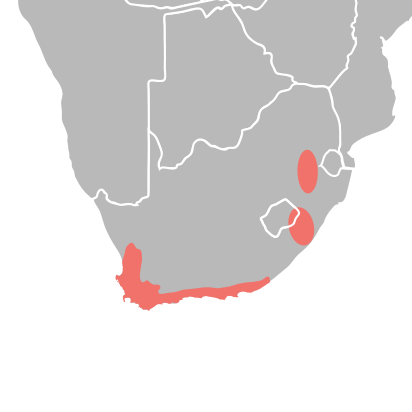
- Georychus capensis distribution

Synonyms
- Mus capensis Pallas, 1778

= Cape mole-rat =

Cape mole-rat Temporal range: Middle Pleistocene to Recent

Species of rodent

The Cape mole-rat (Georychus capensis) is a species of mole-rat endemic to South Africa. It is the only extant species currently described as belonging to the genus Georychus.

== Description ==
Cape mole-rats closely resemble other African mole-rats in physical appearance. They have cylindrical bodies with short limbs, and large feet with leathery soles. The head is large and rounded, and the tail is short, with only a few sparse hairs. As with other mole rats, external ears are absent. The eyes are very small, but they are functional, and when the animals exceptionally leave their tunnels, they see well enough to turn actively and present their powerful incisors to repel approaching attackers. Adults are around 16 centimetres (6.3 in) in head-body length, with a 2 centimetres (0.79 in) tail, and weigh around 180 grams (6.3 oz). Females have three pairs of teats.

Cape mole-rats can most easily be distinguished from other species of mole-rat by the colour pattern of their fur. Most conspicuously, they have prominent white blazes around the ears and eyes, and smaller patches of white fur on the muzzle and often on top of the head. These white patches are the basis for the common name blesmol, Afrikaans for "blaze mole". Most of the fur is russet in colour over the rest of the body, with distinct, silvery-white underparts. The head is darker, sometimes even a charcoal grey shade. The hair on the feet is also white. Unlike the related Damaraland mole-rats, Cape mole-rats have no guard hairs, although there are slightly longer stiff hairs around the mouth and feet, and the animals do have stubby whiskers. Lacking guard hairs, the fur is thick and woolly in texture.

== Distribution and habitat ==
Cape mole-rats inhabit forested and savannah regions across the coastal regions of Western Cape and Eastern Cape provinces in South Africa. Isolated populations have also been reported from KwaZulu-Natal, just east of Lesotho, and from Mpumalanga. Although there are no formally recognised subspecies, this may be due to limited research on the species, and it has been proposed that the mole rats of KwaZulu-Natal may represent an entirely distinct species. They apparently prefer sandy loam, alluvium, or clay soils.

Fossils of Cape mole-rats are known from the middle Pleistocene of Elandsfontein in the Western Cape. Fossils referable to the genus Georychus, but not to the living species, have been identified from the lower Pleistocene at Swartkrans.

== Behaviour ==
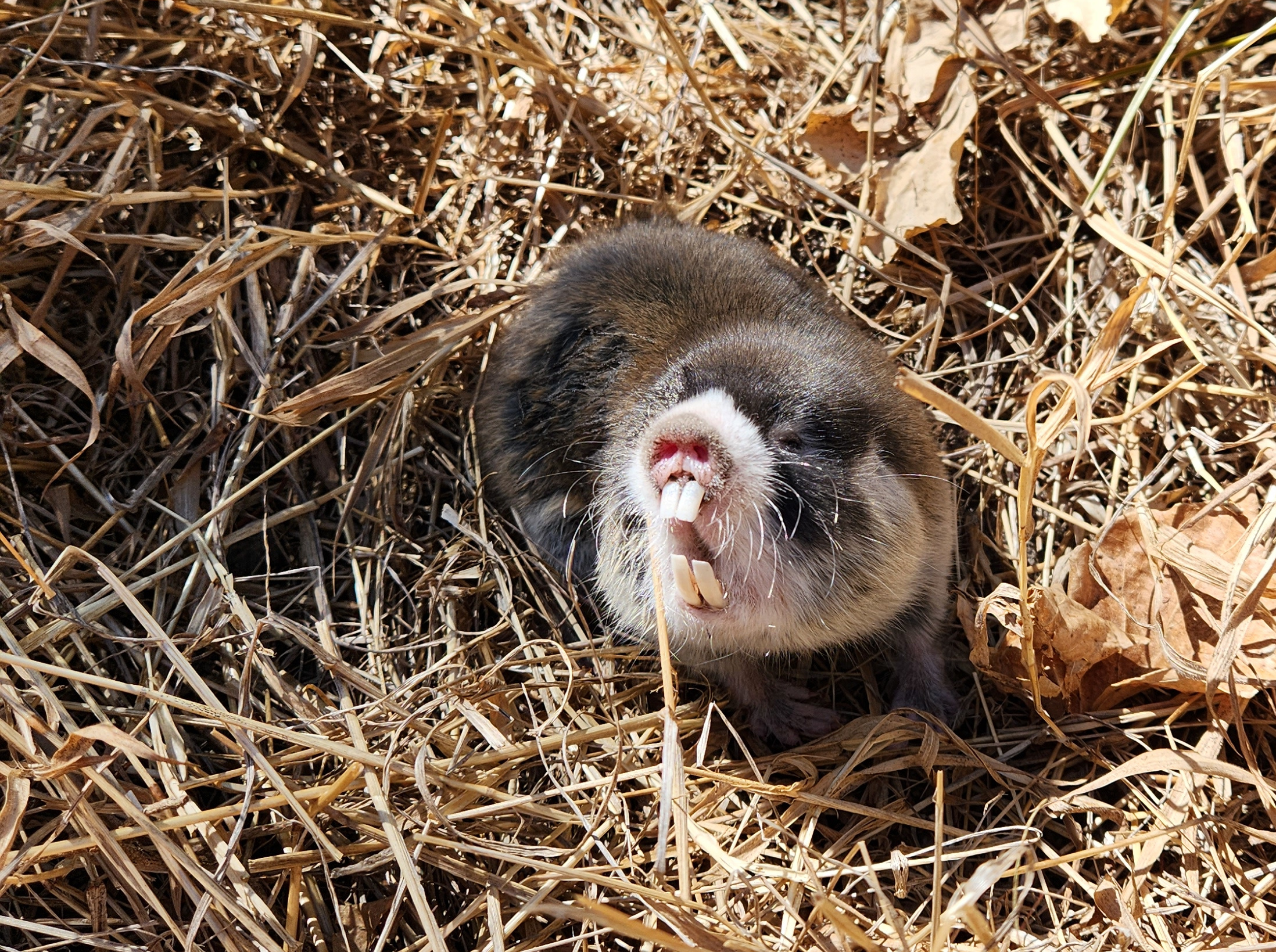
A Cape mole-rat in a defensive posture.

Like other mole-rats, Cape mole-rats rarely travel above ground, and spend most of their lives within excavated burrow systems. Their burrows typically range from 50 to 130 metres (160 to 430 ft) in length, with tunnels about 10 centimetres (3.9 in) wide. Like other mole rat species, but unlike most other species of animals popularly called moles, they dig with their incisors; this enables them to dig through earth much harder than most moles can deal with. Their lips are adapted to close laterally behind the incisors when they gape; this prevents earth from entering the mouth when they dig. The only part the feet play in digging, is in moving the loosened earth to the rear. They are herbivorous, feeding on the bulbs, corms and tubers of plants such as Star-of-Bethlehem, Cape tulips, and wood-sorrels, among others. They obtain this food by digging foraging tunnels to reach plant roots; these tunnels are narrower than their main tunnels and may be as little as 0.5 to 2.5 centimetres (0.20 to 0.98 in) below the surface. Food may also be taken to deeper storage chambers to store up for hard times, or when a female is raising young. They have no need to drink, being able to obtain all the water they need from their diet.

In order to feed on bulbs, Cape mole-rats hold the food item in their fore-paws, chew away the base, and then peel away the husk with their teeth, moving from the tip to the base, in the manner that humans peel bananas. They have an enlarged caecum, and, like rabbits, are coprophagic, passing food through their digestive tract twice.

In addition to storage chambers, the centre of the tunnel system includes a nest, and a separate latrine chamber. The tunnels are entirely closed off from the surface, although their presence may be evident from dome-shaped mounds of excavated material similar to mole hills. As a result, there is little circulation of air within the tunnels, which are therefore hypoxic and humid, but are protected from extremes of weather. The mole rats occasionally travel above ground to forage for surface vegetation, and to disperse to found new burrow systems.

Despite spending almost their entire lives underground, and having very poor eyesight, Cape mole-rats exhibit distinct diurnal rhythms in time with the hours of daylight on the surface, and are primarily nocturnal. Unlike some other species of mole-rat, they are solitary animals, and, except when a female is raising young, only one individual inhabits each burrow system. They are highly aggressive towards other members of their own species outside the breeding season. When encountering a rival, they adopt a rigid posture with the head thrown back and jaws open, chattering their teeth and occasionally making short leaps in the direction of their opponent. Because burrow systems can approach within 2 metres (6 ft 7 in) of each other, burrowing animals warn away rivals using sex-specific seismic signals.

Cape mole-rats become alarmed if they sense a breach in their tunnel system, moving cautiously towards the break, and making characteristic 'pumping' motions with their hindquarters, of unknown significance. Predators that may enter the tunnel system to feed on Cape mole-rats include mole snakes and Cape cobras. They are particularly vulnerable while travelling above ground, where they may also fall victim to jackals, mongooses, owls and grey herons.

== Reproduction ==
During the summer mating season, both sexes drum on the sides of their tunnels with their hind feet, using a different signal than when warning off potential intruders at other times of the year. The drumming is loud enough to be heard above ground at a distance of up to 10 metres (33 ft) away. Once the male finds a partner, courtship and mating are brief, and interspersed with bouts of grooming.

Gestation lasts 44 to 48 days, and a litter of three to ten young are born between August and December. The young are born hairless and blind, weighing only 5 to 12 grams (0.18 to 0.42 oz), and 3 to 4 centimetres (1.2 to 1.6 in) in length. The fur begins to grow on day seven, and the eyes open on day nine. The young grow rapidly, and begin to take solid food around day seventeen, being fully weaned at four weeks of age. By five weeks, siblings begin to show aggression towards one another, and they leave to establish their own burrows at around seven weeks.

Cape mole-rats reach sexual maturity at eighteen months of age, and live up to five years.
