= Nigerian mole-rat =

Nigerian mole rat

Conservation status
- Data Deficient (IUCN 3.1)

Scientific classification
- Kingdom: Animalia
- Phylum: Chordata
- Class: Mammalia
- Order: Rodentia
- Family: Bathyergidae
- Genus: Fukomys
- Species: F. foxi

Binomial name
- Fukomys foxi (Thomas, 1911)

Synonyms
- Cryptomys foxi

Species of mammal

The Nigerian mole-rat (Fukomys foxi) is a species of rodent in the family Bathyergidae. It is found in northern Nigeria and Cameroon. A colonial, subterranean species, its natural habitats are tropical dry lowland grassland, riverside woodland and rocky places.

== Taxonomy ==
The Nigerian mole-rat was first described by the British zoologist Oldfield Thomas in 1911. The species name "foxi" honours the Reverend George Fox who sent twelve specimens to the Natural History Museum in London where Thomas was the curator of mammals. Of these specimens, nine were of a similar size and appearance and two, a male and a female, were considerably larger with more massive heads. It is not clear whether these specimens were from a single colony, but it is quite possible that the two larger individuals were a breeding pair, and the others were non-breeding adults, a colony structure common among mole rats.

== Description ==
The Nigerian mole-rat has been little studied. It is a small species with adults having a head and body length averaging 145 millimetres (5.7 in) with the largest individuals reaching 160 millimetres (6.3 in). The short dense fur is black with a patch of white on the head and sometimes some white markings on the underside.

== Distribution and habitat ==
The original specimens came from a single location on the Jos Plateau in northern Nigeria, and a further six specimens were obtained from the same region in 1966. This mole-rat is also found in the countryside around Ngaoundéré in Cameroon, where it is common in some localities. Its natural habitat is grassland, wooded areas beside streams and rocky areas. It lives in underground colonies with extensive systems of tunnels.

== Status ==
The International Union for Conservation of Nature considers this species too poorly known for it to assess its conservation status so it has rated it as "data deficient". The Jos Plateau has fertile soils and is used for the growing of crops such as potatoes which cannot be grown in other parts of the country. Whether increasing agriculture and deforestation due to collection of firewood will impact on the species is not known, but other species of mole-rat have adapted to increasing amounts of agriculture.
