= Ghana mole-rat =

Conservation status
- Least Concern (IUCN 3.1)

Scientific classification
- Kingdom: Animalia
- Phylum: Chordata
- Class: Mammalia
- Order: Rodentia
- Family: Bathyergidae
- Genus: Fukomys
- Species: F. zechi

Binomial name
- Fukomys zechi (Matschie, 1900)

Species of rodent

The Ghana mole-rat or Togo mole-rat (Fukomys zechi) is a species of rodent in the family Bathyergidae. It is endemic to Ghana.

Its natural habitats are moist savanna, subtropical or tropical dry shrubland, subtropical or tropical dry lowland grassland, caves, and arable land. It commonly breeds during rainy months such as March to August. In a colony, reproduction is limited to one male and one female.

An important source of food for the Ghana mole-rats is the succulent roots of most plants. The mole rats eat the roots and taproots of various plants such as Arachis, Vigna, Cucumeropsis and Dioscorea abyssinica, as well as young Anacardium.
