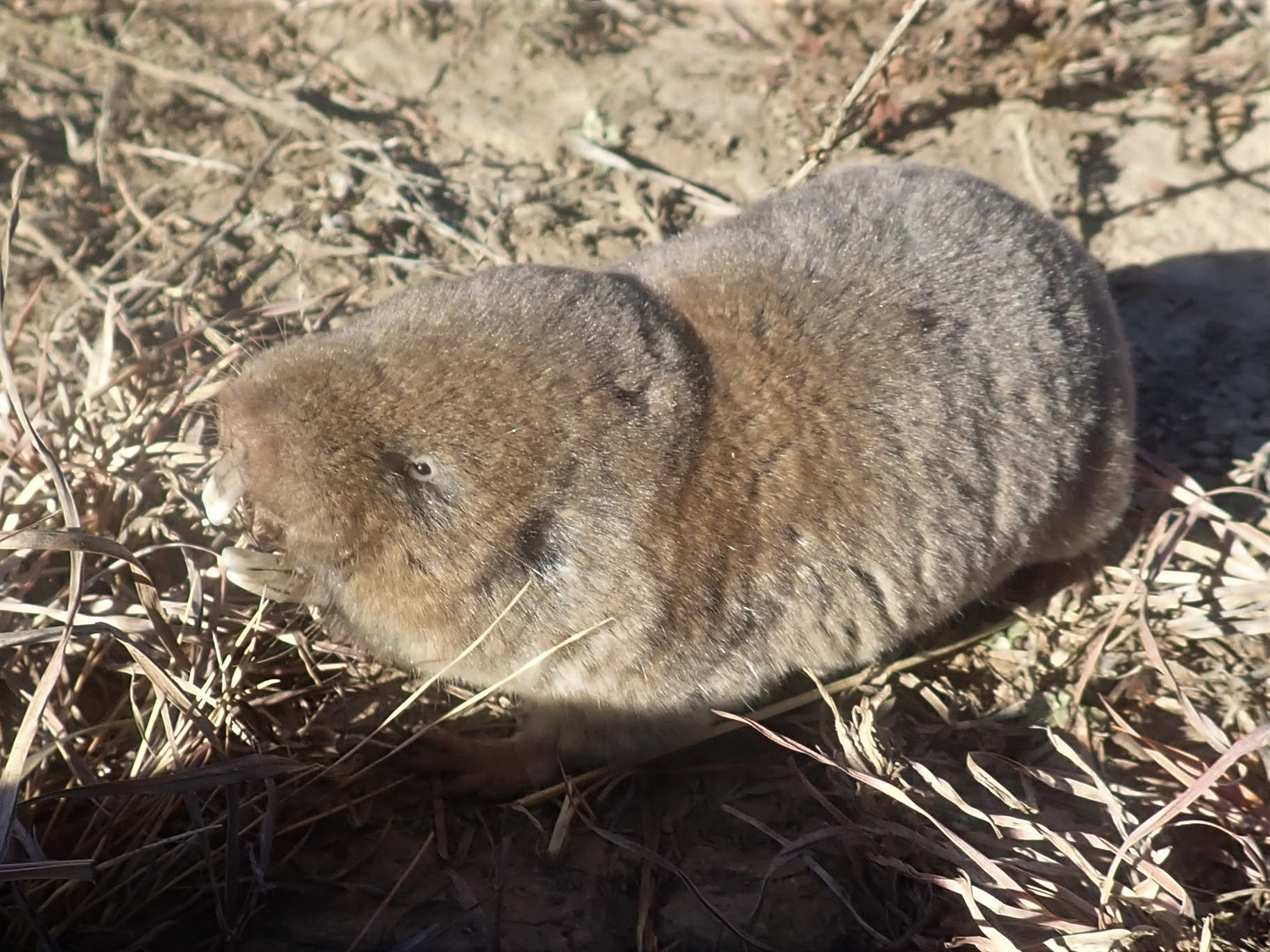

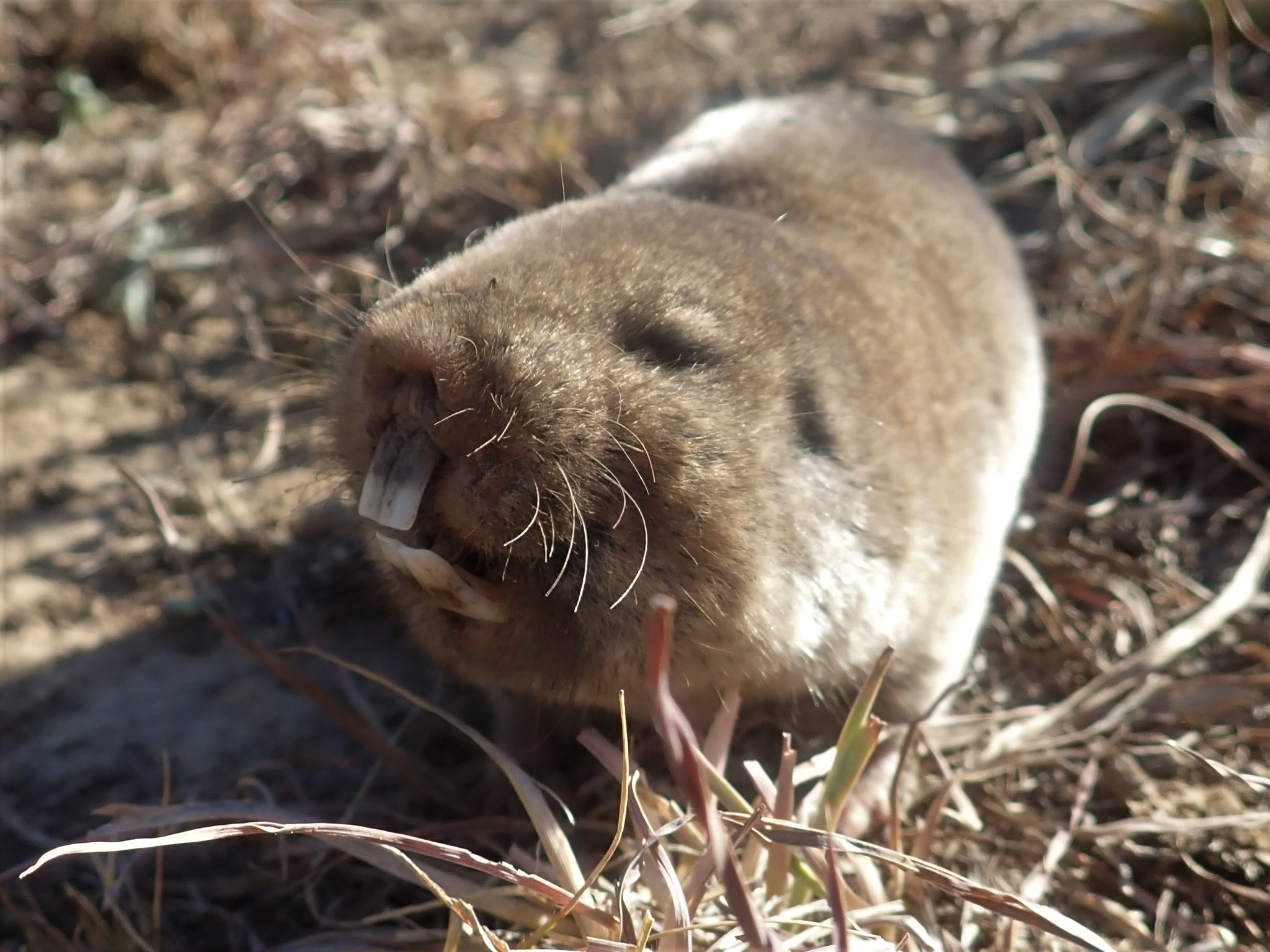
- In South Africa

Conservation status
- Least Concern (IUCN 3.1)

Scientific classification
- Kingdom: Animalia
- Phylum: Chordata
- Class: Mammalia
- Infraclass: Placentalia
- Order: Rodentia
- Family: Bathyergidae
- Genus: Cryptomys
- Species: C. hottentotus

Binomial name
- Cryptomys hottentotus (Lesson, 1826)
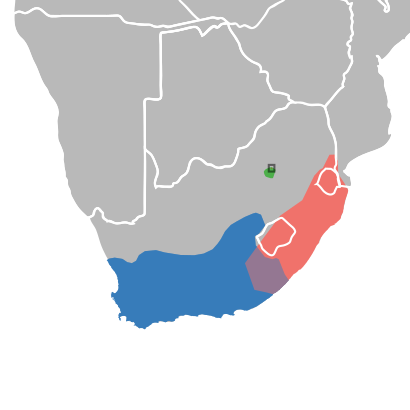
- Cryptomys distribution.png C. hottentotus in blue

= Common mole-rat =

Species of rodent

The common mole-rat, African mole-rat, or Hottentot mole-rat, (Cryptomys hottentotus) is a burrowing rodent found in Southern Africa, in particular in the Western Cape province of South Africa. It also occurs in Eswatini, Lesotho, Malawi, Mozambique, Tanzania, Zambia, and Zimbabwe. It is a species in the subfamily Bathyerginae.

== Taxonomy ==
René Primevère Lesson was the first to describe the common mole-rat in 1826, based on an animal captured near Paarl, and called it Bathyergus hottentotus. The following year, the Dutch zoologist Anton Brants described a specimen from the eastern part of the Cape Colony which he named Bathyergus caecutiens. In 1828, Andrew Smith described Bathyergus ludwigii. Around 1900 these little mole rats were no longer considered to fit into the genus Bathyergus, and various forms were described in the genus Georychus, namely G. exenticus in 1899 by Édouard Louis Trouessart, G. jorisseni in 1909 by Henry Lyster Jameson, G. albus in 1913 and G. vandamii in 1917, both by Austin Roberts. The same Roberts described two more forms in 1924, but now under the current genus name Cryptomys, namely C. cradockensis and C. transvaalensis. However, the current combination was already made in 1906 by Oldfield Thomas and Harold Schwann, but with an unnecessary addition: Cryptomys hottentotus talpoides. In 1964, Gerrit de Graaff in his dissertation considers all these forms as belonging to the same species and thus all other names are synonyms of Cryptomys hottentotus.

== Physical appearance ==
Typically the body of a mature specimen of the common mole-rat may be as short as 10.5 to as long as 16.5 cm; the tail may be 1.2 to 3.8 cm. The fur is thick and evenly colored, usually grey or brown. In some specimens there is white spot on the head. The shape of the body is cylindrical with short appendages. Common mole-rats have ungrooved chisel-like incisors that are used for digging as well as for feeding and fighting.

== Reproduction and development ==
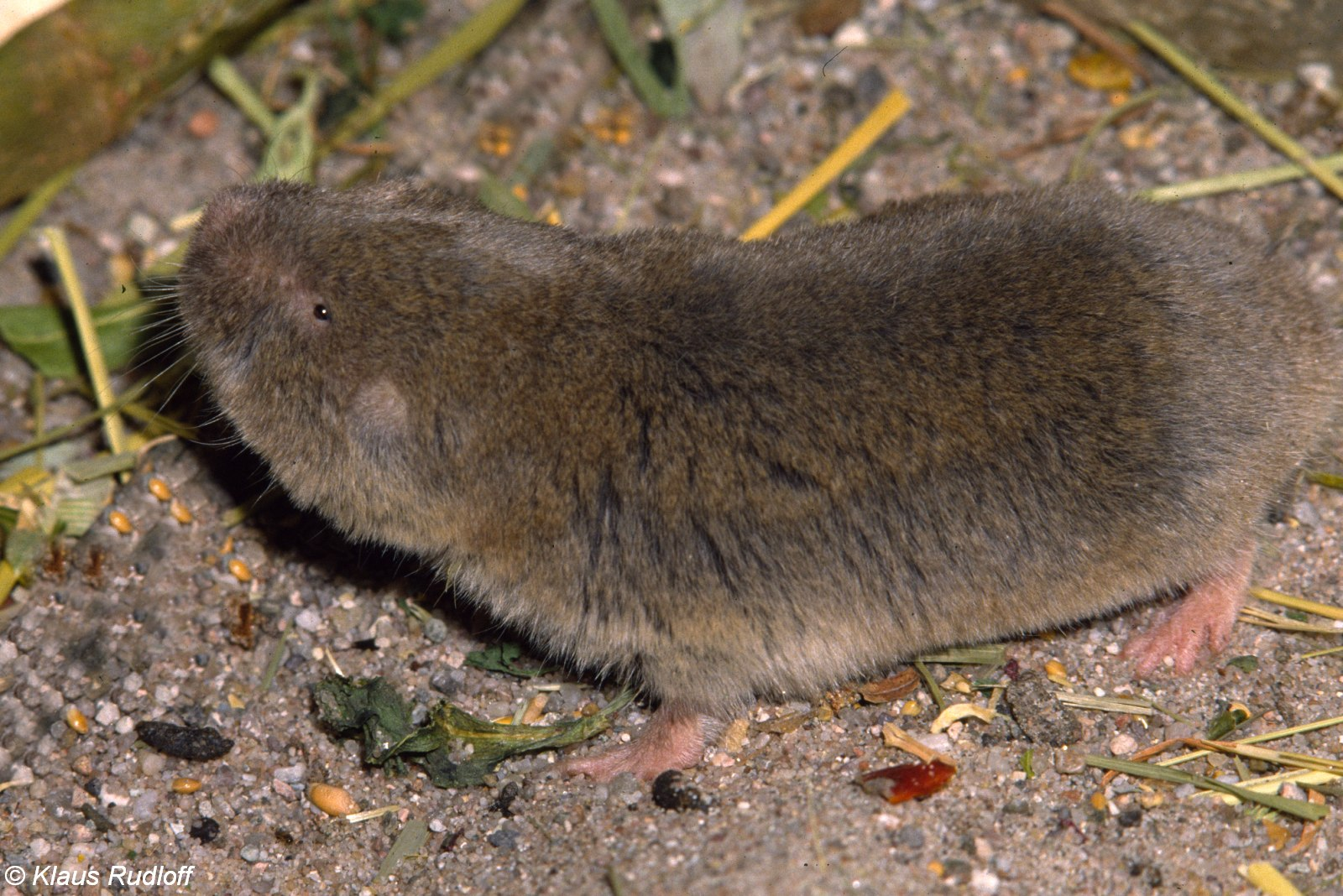
Frankfurt Zoo

Common mole-rats form colonies, essentially family groups with the largest female and male being the only reproductive pair. Mating begins in September and October. During courtship the female raises her tail and allows the mate to smell her genital region. The male then gently chews on her hind region, mounts and mates. The birth of offspring is restricted to the southern hemisphere summer, during which there may be one or two litters of up to five pups. The gestation period is about 81 days. The average age at reproductive maturity is about 450 days. Females maintain reproductive function during non-reproductive months.

== Ecology ==
Common mole-rats are fossorial and can live in a wide range of substrates. They are herbivorous, mainly eating geophytes (plants with underground storage organs) and grass rhizomes. Common mole-rats are very widespread, thus their abundance is not well known. This species shows signs of localization due to soil requirements. The pattern of burrowing systems for common mole-rats optimizes their access to food, especially geophytes. Burrowing has a negative economic impact in that it damages human property but it is also positive in that it improves soil drainage and turnover.

== Physiological attributes ==
Common mole-rats are endothermic, having the ability to generate their own heat and keep their body temperature above ambient temperature. In arid environments they have lower individual body masses; this reduces their need for food and improves energy conservation.

These mole-rats also have long sensory hairs called vibrissae that stand out from the pelage (fur covering) over their body and hind legs.

== Behavior ==
Common mole-rats live in family units of up to 14 individuals. They are eusocial in that colony members are specialized for functions such as reproduction and for cooperative care of the young. Younger mole-rats would likely be workers and older mole-rats could be casual workers. These workers, for the most part, burrow and forage, with casual workers not working as much as younger workers. The oldest mole rats are breeders.

== Lifespan ==
The maximum recorded lifespan of an African Mole-Rat is 30 years.

== Tunneling ==
Mole-rats have cylindrical bodies with short limbs adapted to activities inside their tunnels. Their loose skins and dense fur assist in negotiating small spaces. They can practically somersault within their loose skins. Their hairy cheeks can close behind the incisors to keep dirt and soil from the throat while they dig. In digging they loosen soil with the incisors, then use their feet to pass the loosened soil back beneath the body. When the mole-rat has accumulated a suitable batch of loose earth, it reverses to push the soil out of the tunnel.

== Conservation ==
The IUCN Red List lists the species as Least Concern. Because of their dense and widespread population and their adaptability to pasturelands and rural gardens, their prognosis is a positive one.
