= Ochre mole-rat =

Conservation status
- Least Concern (IUCN 3.1)

Scientific classification
- Kingdom: Animalia
- Phylum: Chordata
- Class: Mammalia
- Order: Rodentia
- Family: Bathyergidae
- Genus: Fukomys
- Species: F. ochraceocinereus

Binomial name
- Fukomys ochraceocinereus (Heuglin, 1864)

Synonyms
- Cryptomys ochraceocinereus

Species of rodent

The ochre mole-rat (Fukomys ochraceocinereus) is a species of rodent in the family Bathyergidae. It is found in Central African Republic, Democratic Republic of the Congo, South Sudan, and Uganda. Its natural habitats are moist savanna, subtropical or tropical dry shrubland, subtropical or tropical dry lowland grassland, caves, and arable land.
