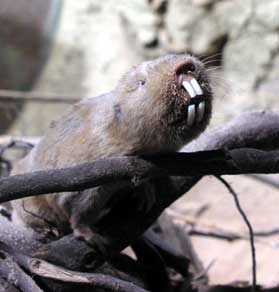

Conservation status
- Least Concern (IUCN 3.1)

Scientific classification
- Kingdom: Animalia
- Phylum: Chordata
- Class: Mammalia
- Order: Rodentia
- Family: Bathyergidae
- Genus: Fukomys
- Species: F. anselli

Binomial name
- Fukomys anselli (Burda, Zima, Scharff, Macholán & Kawalika, 1999)

Synonyms
- Cryptomys anselli

= Ansell's mole-rat =

Species of rodent

Ansell's mole-rat (Fukomys anselli), also known as the Zambian mole-rat, is a species of rodent in the family Bathyergidae. It is endemic to Zambia. Its natural habitats are moist savanna and miombo forests. It is noted for its very long tunnels, up to 2.8 km (1.7 mi) for a single colony of only ten individuals. The colonies are made of a eusocial system. They include a main reproductive king and queen that are thought to be faithful to one another.

Ansell's mole-rats (Fukomys anselli) develop their underground habitat using their anatomical features such as body shape, chiseled teeth, and large jaws to dig through the soil. These long tunnels often branch off at various levels in the soil which allow mole-rats to create the space needed for their survival, such as searching for plants, creating food storage areas, and communicating with other nearby family groups.

African mole-rats (Fukomys anselli) brain differs from epigeic species. Although mole-rats are underground dwelling animals, their brains have a similar structure to other rodents. However, their somatosensory cortex is notably augmented, which then occupy the areas that are typically visual in epigeic rodents. Additionally, on bathyergidae mole-rats, their visual cortex is smaller but is significantly stronger than other similar rodents.

Ansell's mole-rat at Leipzig Zoo, Germany
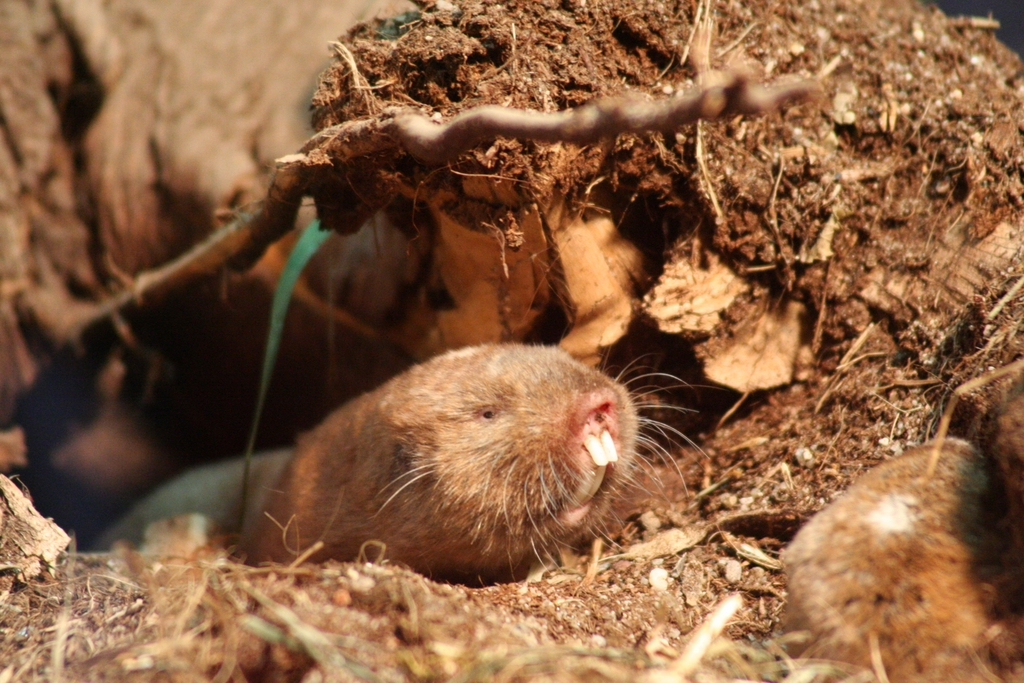

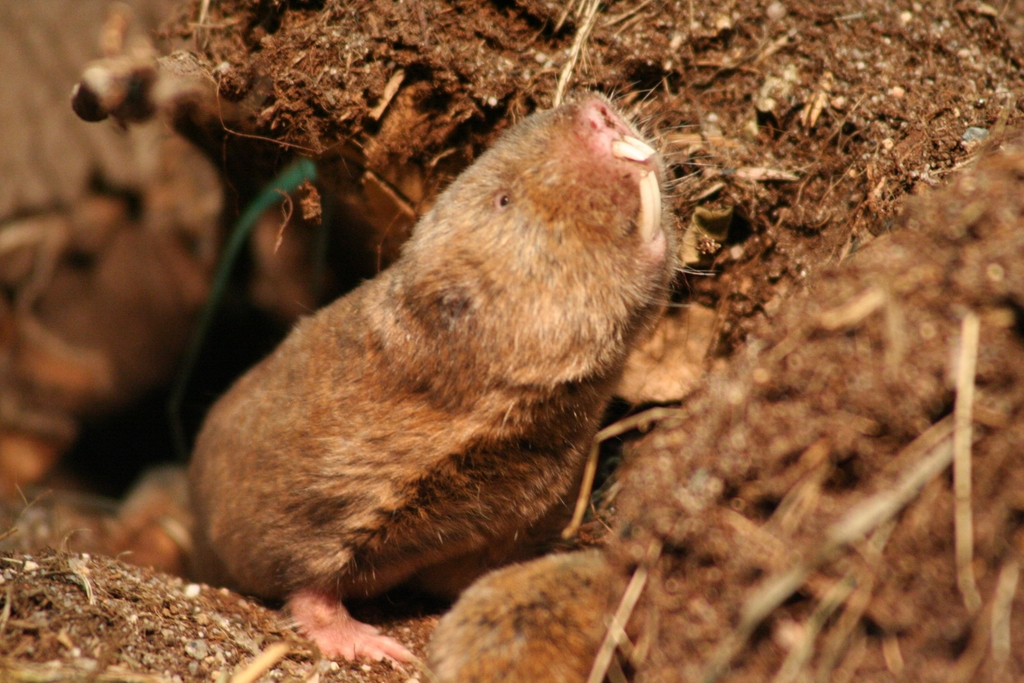

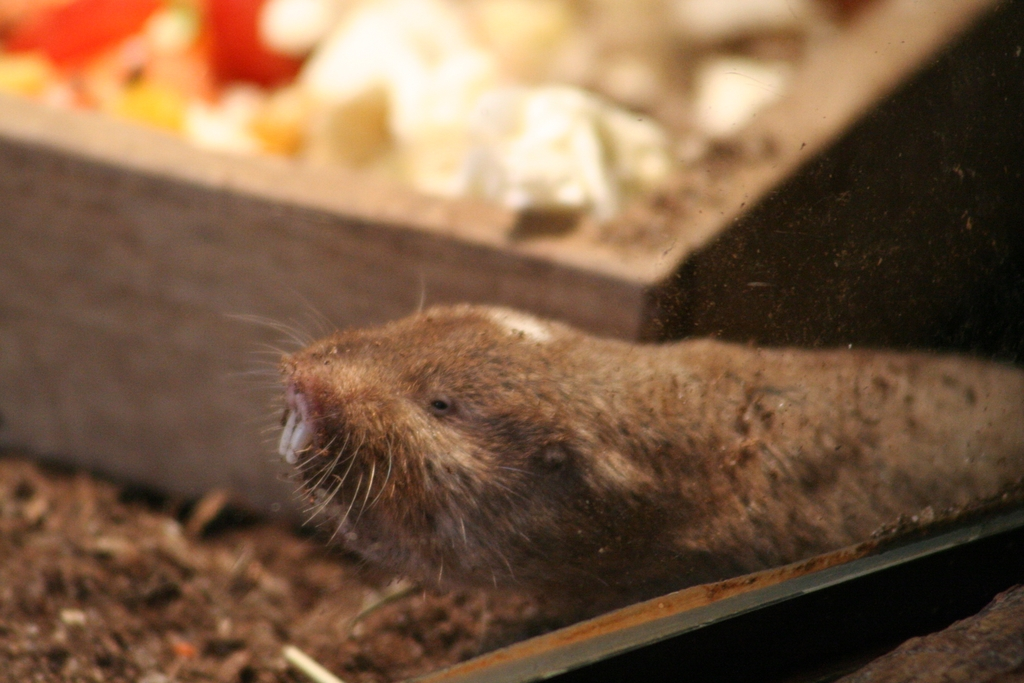
