= Bocage's mole-rat =

Conservation status
- Least Concern (IUCN 3.1)

Scientific classification
- Kingdom: Animalia
- Phylum: Chordata
- Class: Mammalia
- Order: Rodentia
- Family: Bathyergidae
- Genus: Fukomys
- Species: F. bocagei

Binomial name
- Fukomys bocagei (de Winton, 1897)

Synonyms
- Cryptomys bocagei

Species of rodent

Bocage's mole-rat (Fukomys bocagei) is a species of rodent in the family Bathyergidae. It is found in Angola, Namibia, possibly Democratic Republic of the Congo, and possibly Zambia. Its natural habitats are subtropical or tropical dry forests, dry savanna, subtropical or tropical dry lowland grassland, and caves.
