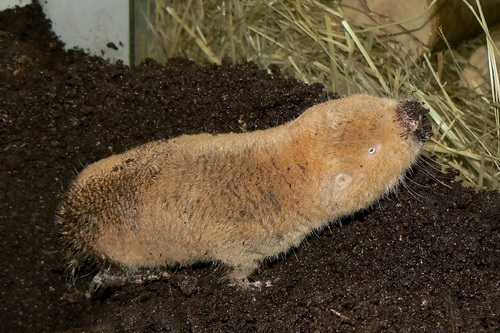

Conservation status
- Least Concern (IUCN 3.1)

Scientific classification
- Kingdom: Animalia
- Phylum: Chordata
- Class: Mammalia
- Order: Rodentia
- Family: Bathyergidae
- Genus: Fukomys
- Species: F. mechowii

Binomial name
- Fukomys mechowii (Peters, 1881)

Synonyms
- Cryptomys mechowi Cryptomys mechowii

= Mechow's mole-rat =

Species of rodent

Mechow's mole-rat (Fukomys mechowii) is a species of rodent in the family Bathyergidae. It is found in Angola, Democratic Republic of the Congo, Zambia, and possibly Malawi. Its natural habitats are moist savanna, subtropical or tropical dry shrubland, and subtropical or tropical dry lowland grassland. This mole-rat was first described by the German naturalist Wilhelm Peters in 1881. The specific epithet honours the Prussian explorer and naturalist Friedrich Wilhelm Alexander von Mechow.

== Distribution and habitat ==
Mechow's mole-rat is found in Central Africa. Its range extends from central Angola and northern Zambia to southern and eastern parts of the Democratic Republic of Congo and southwestern Tanzania. Reports of it occurring in Malawi probably refer to a different species. Its burrows are found in clay, stony and sandy soils. Its typical habitat is scrubby savannah or dense woodland in areas with rainfall in excess of 1,100 millimetres (43 in). It also occurs in areas under cultivation, parks, gardens and pine plantations.

== Ecology ==
Mechow's mole-rat is a colonial species and lives in groups of between two and twenty or more individuals. Mole-rats are adapted for life underground and have cylindrical bodies, small eyes and large incisors which they use for digging. The tunnelling activities are mostly for foraging purposes as they search for the roots and tubers that form their diet.

== Status ==
The International Union for Conservation of Nature has assessed the conservation status of Mechow's mole-rat as being of "least concern". It has a wide range and is a common species that has adapted to live in cultivated areas. Although it is caught and eaten as food, especially in Zambia, this seems to have little impact on its total population which seems to be stable.
