= Kafue mole-rat =

Conservation status
- Vulnerable (IUCN 3.1)

Scientific classification
- Kingdom: Animalia
- Phylum: Chordata
- Class: Mammalia
- Order: Rodentia
- Family: Bathyergidae
- Genus: Fukomys
- Species: F. kafuensis

Binomial name
- Fukomys kafuensis (Burda, Zima, Scharff, Macholán & Kawalika, 1999)

Synonyms
- Cryptomys kafuensis

Species of rodent

The Kafue mole-rat (Fukomys kafuensis) is a species of rodent in the family Bathyergidae. It is endemic to Zambia. Its natural habitat is moist savanna.
