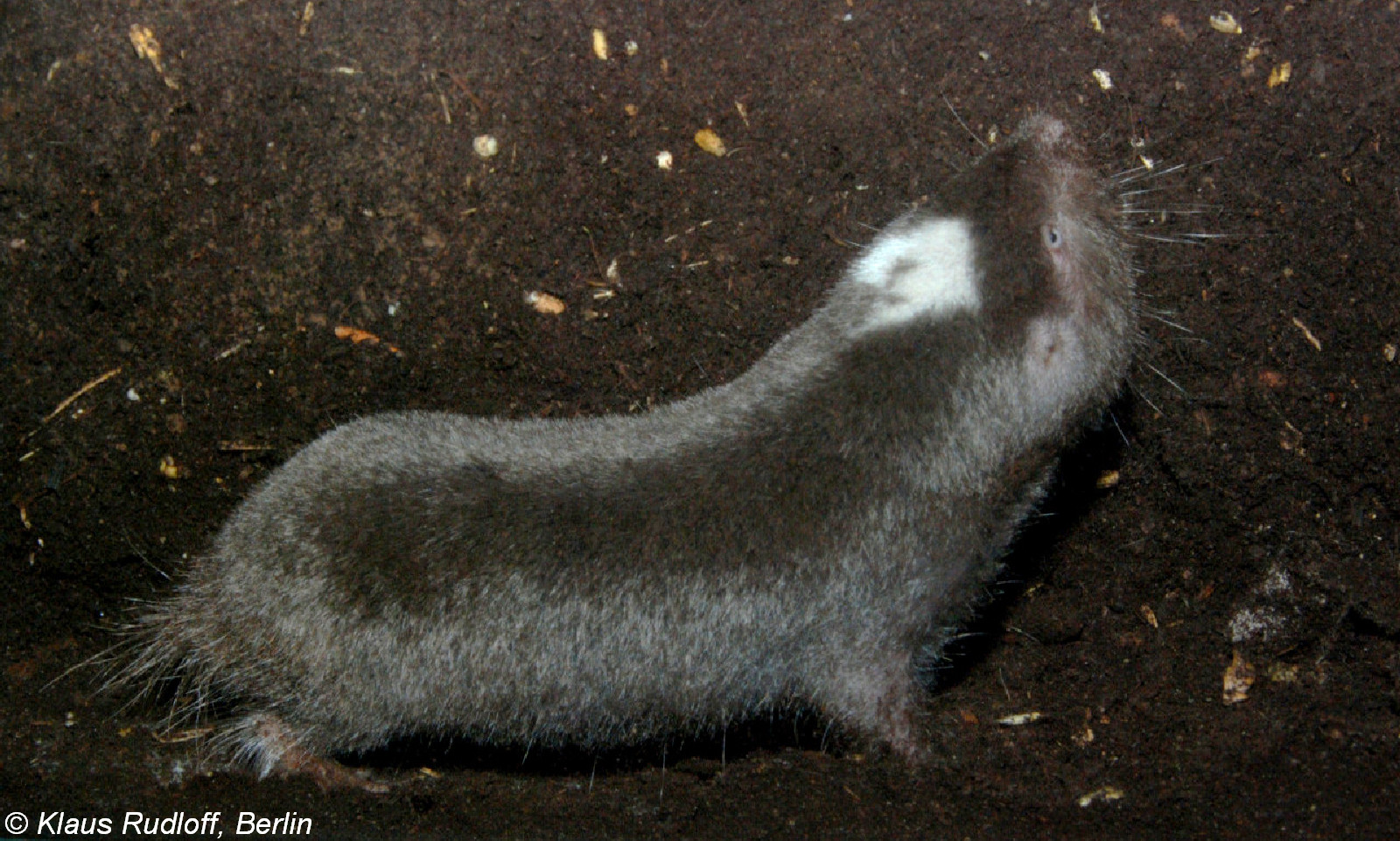

Conservation status
- Least Concern (IUCN 3.1)

Scientific classification
- Kingdom: Animalia
- Phylum: Chordata
- Class: Mammalia
- Order: Rodentia
- Family: Bathyergidae
- Genus: Fukomys
- Species: F. darlingi

Binomial name
- Fukomys darlingi (Thomas, 1895)

Synonyms
- Cryptomys darlingi

= Mashona mole-rat =

Species of rodent

The Mashona mole-rat (Fukomys darlingi) is a species of rodent in the family Bathyergidae. It is found in Mozambique and Zimbabwe. Its natural habitats are subtropical or tropical dry shrubland, subtropical or tropical dry lowland grassland, and caves.
