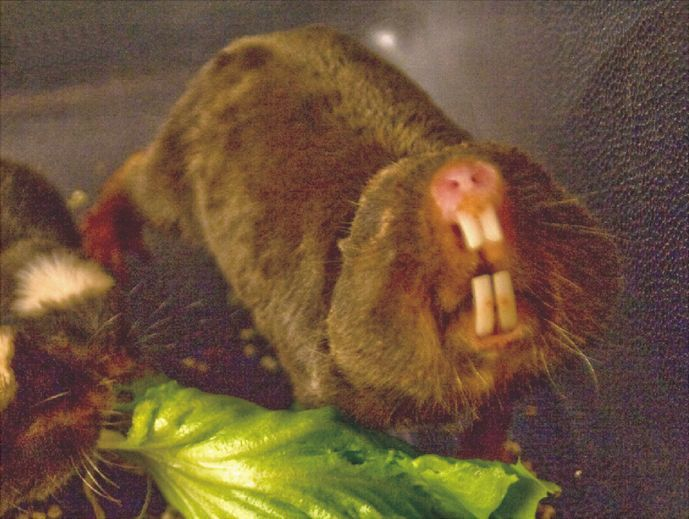

Conservation status
- Least Concern (IUCN 3.1)

Scientific classification
- Kingdom: Animalia
- Phylum: Chordata
- Class: Mammalia
- Order: Rodentia
- Family: Bathyergidae
- Genus: Fukomys
- Species: F. damarensis

Binomial name
- Fukomys damarensis (Ogilby, 1838)

Synonyms
- Cryptomys damarensis

= Damaraland mole-rat =

Species of rodent from southern Africa

The Damaraland mole-rat (Fukomys damarensis), Damara mole rat or Damaraland blesmol, is a burrowing rodent found in southern Africa. Along with the smaller, less hairy, naked mole rat, it is a species of eusocial mammal.

== Description ==
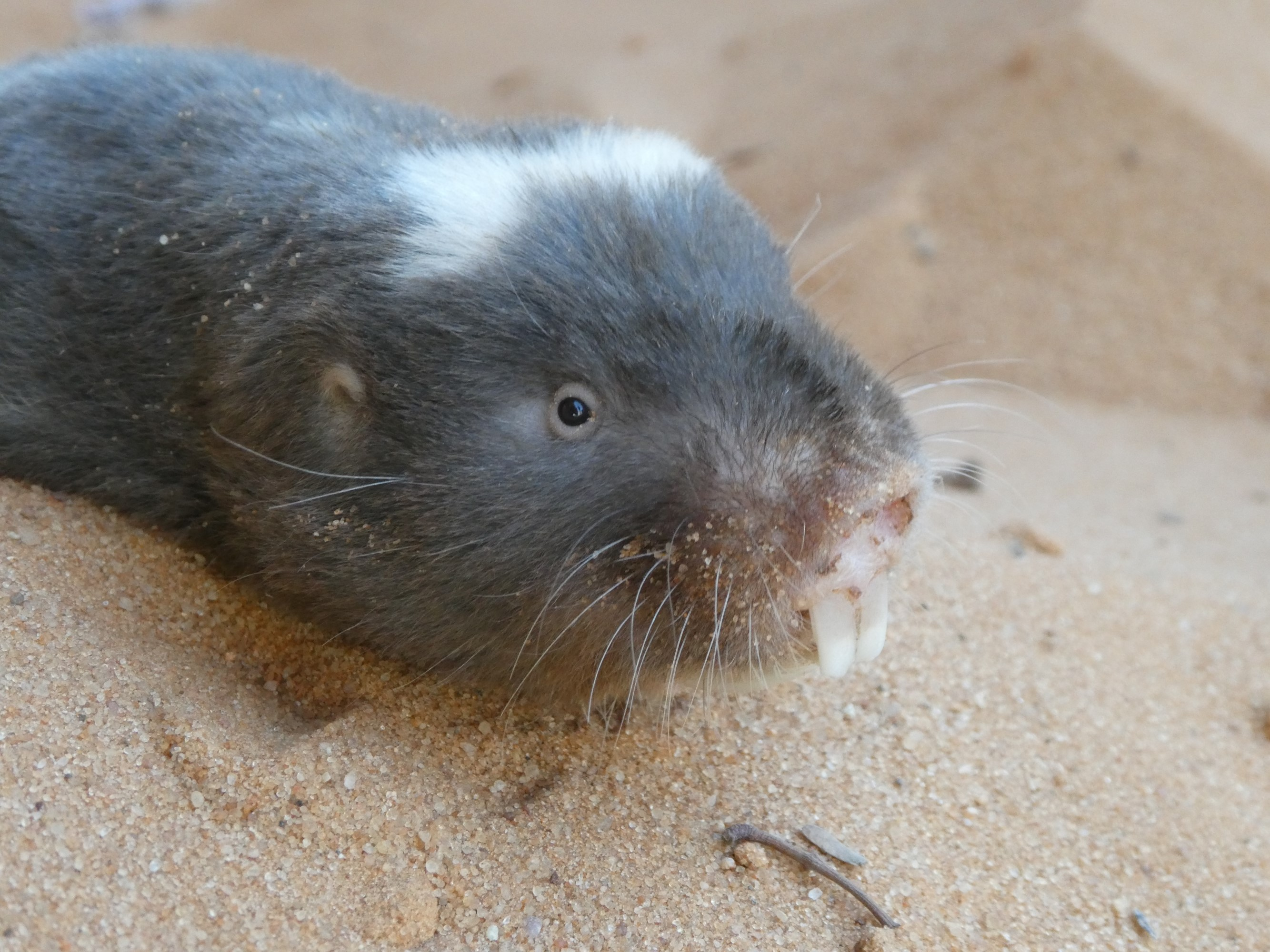
Damaraland mole-rat. Note the white patch of fur on top of the head.

Like other blesmols, the Damaraland mole-rat has a cylindrical body with short, stout limbs, large feet, and a conical head. It is also similar in size to most other African mole-rats, having a head-body length of 14 to 20 cm (5.5 to 7.9 in), with a short, 2 to 3 cm (0.79 to 1.18 in), tail, and weighing between 100 and 280 grams (3.5 and 9.9 oz). There are no external ears, and the blue-coloured eyes are tiny with thick eyelids. The incisor teeth are large and prominent, with flaps of skin behind them to prevent soil from falling into the throat while the animal is using them to dig.

The fur is short and thick, and varies from fawn to almost black, with shades of brown being most common. There is always a white patch on the top of the head, although its exact shape varies, and there may also be additional blotches of white fur elsewhere on the body. Longer sensory hairs project above the fur over much of the body, with the facial whiskers being particularly long. Females have six teats.

== Distribution and habitat ==
Although named specifically for Damaraland, the mole-rats are found across much of southern Africa, including Botswana, Namibia, South Africa, Zambia, and Zimbabwe. They inhabit warm, semi-arid environments dominated by savannah scrubland or sandy grasslands. They are most commonly associated with red Kalahari psamments, and are found only where there is a sufficient supply of plants with subterranean storage organs.

== Biology ==
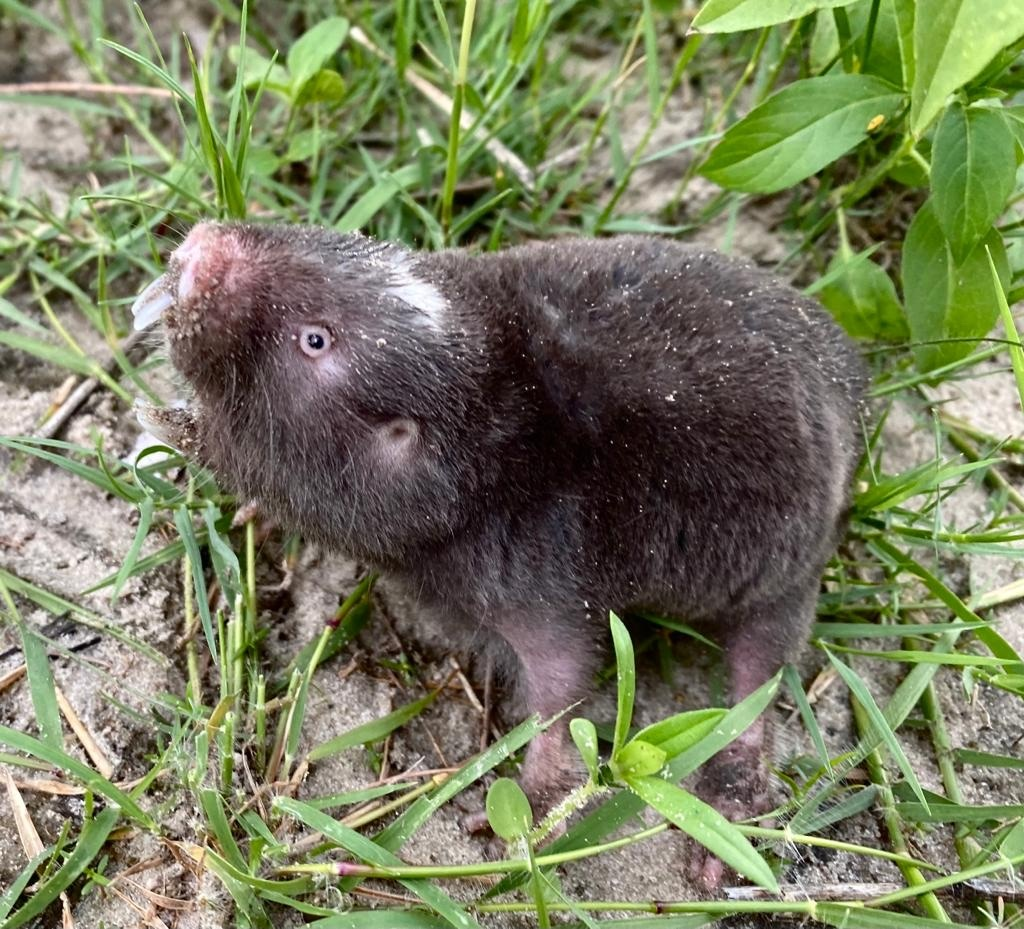
In Botswana

Damaraland mole-rats are herbivorous, feeding solely on tubers, corms, and bulbs. Favoured foods include such plants as Acanthosicyos, Star-of-Bethlehem, Ledebouria, and Talinum. Their natural predators include mole snakes, and occasionally other local snakes, such as cobras. They do not drink, obtaining all their water from their food, which is also an important source of minerals. Unlike most other mammals, they can effectively metabolise these minerals without access to vitamin D, which they lack because they are normally never exposed to sunlight. The basal metabolic rate of Damaraland mole rats is also unusually low for mammals of their size, at just 0.66 cm^{3} O_{2} / g · h.

Despite living in an entirely subterranean environment, Damaraland mole-rats exhibit circadian rhythms, and are active primarily during the day. Their levels of the hormone melatonin can be altered by artificially changing the length of apparent daylight, suggesting that they are at least able to distinguish light from dark, although their eyesight may otherwise be very poor.

== Behaviour ==
Damaraland mole-rats live in networks of tunnels, which they dig with their front teeth. The tunnels are 65 to 75 mm (2.6 to 3.0 in) in diameter, and may stretch for up to 1 km (0.62 mi). They have no connection to the surface, although their presence can be inferred from dome-shaped molehills of excavated earth pushed up to the surface. As a result, the tunnels develop their own microclimate, containing warm, moist air, with low oxygen levels. Most digging occurs after rainfall, since dry soil is too difficult to excavate. Because they live in arid environments, this means that Damaraland mole-rats can be extremely active over short periods; a typical colony has been estimated to excavate three tons of soil over a two-week period.

The burrow system consists primarily of foraging tunnels, which the rats dig in search of food. While particularly large tubers and bulbs are at least partially eaten where they are found, smaller ones are dragged to food storage chambers beneath the foraging tunnels. The foraging tunnels are typically only 5 to 25 cm (2.0 to 9.8 in) beneath the soil surface, but are connected to a smaller number of deep tunnels that lead down to the storage chambers, latrines, and a central nest that may be as much as 2.5 m (8 ft 2 in) underground.

Each burrow system is inhabited by a single colony of mole rats, typically with about twelve members, although colonies can range from as little as two to as many as forty members. The colony is eusocial, consisting of a single breeding pair and their non-reproductive offspring. The non-reproductive members of the colony spend their time foraging and maintaining the tunnel system, in particular closing any breaches that may occur. Intruders from other colonies are generally rejected, although DNA paternity studies show that at least some non-reproductive members of a colony may have been fathered by outsiders. The colony has a clearly defined hierarchy, with the breeding male dominant, followed by the breeding female, then non-reproductive males, and finally non-reproductive females.

Colonies fragment if the breeding female dies, with most surviving members dispersing to new locations. Particularly large individuals may also leave the colony to establish a new burrow system. In such cases, dispersal usually only occurs during rainy weather, ensuring that digging will be relatively easy once a suitable location has been found. New colonies are established by unrelated males and females, which become the new breeding pair. Dispersing individuals travel above ground, and are therefore vulnerable to predation from a wide range of animals; some studies have shown that only around 10 percent of dispersing individuals are later found in new colonies. For example, while small groups of siblings may sometimes leave a burrow system at the same time, normally only one survives to found a new colony.

The Damaraland mole-rat is less vocal than the naked mole-rat, making only some birdlike chirps.

== Reproduction ==
As eusocial animals, only the breeding pair within a colony is capable of reproduction. Non-reproductive individuals are not truly sterile, however, and become capable of reproduction if they establish a colony of their own. The reproductive systems of non-reproductive females are underdeveloped, with small, unvascularised uteri and tiny ovaries that contain undeveloped germ cells, but which are incapable of ovulation. Non-reproductive males have smaller testes than their reproductive counterparts and produce little, if any, viable sperm. The non-reproductive status of other adults is maintained by the presence of the breeding female. While her removal causes previously non-reproductive females to become fully fertile, they will only mate with unrelated males, thus avoiding incest within the colony.

The breeding female initiates courtship by calling and drumming with her hind feet. The pair then chase each other in a tight circle before mating. Mating occurs frequently over a ten-day period, and gestation lasts 78 to 92 days. Females can produce up to three litters of one to six pups per year. The pups are initially hairless, with closed eyes, and only weigh 8 to 9 grams (0.28 to 0.32 oz). They are weaned after 28 days, and reach adult size after around 14 months.

== Genetics ==
The Damaraland mole-rat's karyotype shows 74 or 78 chromosomes (2n). Its fundamental number is 92.
