= Boin Tano Forest Reserve =

Forest reserve in Ghana

- IUCN category V (protected landscape/seascape)
- Location within Ghana
- Location: Aowin Municipal, Western North Region, Ghana
- Nearest city: Sekondi-Takoradi
- Coordinates: 5°30′24″N 2°38′21″W
- Area: 129 km^{2} (12,900 ha; 50 sq mi)
- Established: 1968

The Boin Tano Forest Reserve is a nature reserve located in the Western North Region of Ghana. It was established in 1968. This site, which is 129 km^{2} (50 sq mi), is rich in both floral and faunal species.

== Environment ==
The Boin Tano Forest Reserve is located only five degrees north of the Equator and around 50 kilometres (31 mi) north of the Gulf of Guinea in Atlantic Ocean, therefore giving it a warm and humid climate. Grasslands mixed with shrublands and forests dominate the reserve. Hundreds of different species live within this protected area and its boundaries.

=== Wildlife ===
==== Birds ====
The reserve has been designated an Important Bird Area (IBA) by BirdLife International because it supports significant populations of many bird species.

==== Mammals and amphibians ====
Species	Class	Order	Family	Genus	Pop.	Status (Note: For the conservation status criteria see the table below.)
Aba roundleaf bat	Mammalia	Chiroptera	Hipposideridae	Hipposideros	—	LC
Abo bat	Mammalia	Chiroptera	Vespertilionidae	Glauconycteris	—	LC
African brush-tailed porcupine	Mammalia	Rodentia	Hystricidae	Atherurus	—	LC
African buffalo	Mammalia	Artiodactyla	Bovidae	Syncerus	—	LC
African bush elephant	Mammalia	Proboscidea	Elephantidae	Loxodonta	—	VU
African civet	Mammalia	Carnivora	Viverridae	Civettictis	—	LC
African clawless otter	Mammalia	Carnivora	Mustelidae	Aonyx	—	LC
African common toad	Amphibia	Anura	Bufonidae	Amietophrynus	—	LC
African foam-nest tree frog	Amphibia	Anura	Rhacophoridae	Chiromantis	—	LC
African giant squirrel	Mammalia	Rodentia	Sciuridae	Protoxerus	—	LC
African golden cat	Mammalia	Carnivora	Felidae	Profelis	—	NT
African palm civet	Mammalia	Carnivora	Nandiniidae	Nandinia	—	LC
African white-bellied pangolin	Mammalia	Pholidota	Manidae	Manis	—	NT
African yellow bat	Mammalia	Chiroptera	Vespertilionidae	Scotophilus	—	LC
Ahl's River frog	Amphibia	Anura	Petropedetidae	Phrynobatrachus	—	LC
Allen's wood mouse	Mammalia	Rodentia	Muridae	Hylomyscus	—	LC
Amietophrynus maculatus	Amphibia	Anura	Bufonidae	Amietophrynus	—	LC
Arthroleptis variabilis	Amphibia	Anura	Arthroleptidae	Arthroleptis	—	LC
Aubria subsigillata	Amphibia	Anura	Pyxicephalidae	Aubria	—	LC
Baer's Hylomyscus	Mammalia	Rodentia	Muridae	Hylomyscus	—	EN
Banana pipistrelle	Mammalia	Chiroptera	Vespertilionidae	Neoromicia	—	LC
Bate's slit-faced bat	Mammalia	Chiroptera	Nycteridae	Nycteris	—	LC
Bay duiker	Mammalia	Artiodactyla	Bovidae	Cephalophus	—	LC
Beatrix's bat	Mammalia	Chiroptera	Vespertilionidae	Glauconycteris	—	LC
Beecroft's flying squirrel	Mammalia	Rodentia	Anomaluridae	Anomalurus	—	LC
Benito roundleaf bat	Mammalia	Chiroptera	Hipposideridae	Hipposideros	—	LC
Big-eyed forest tree frog	Amphibia	Anura	Hyperoliidae	Leptopelis	—	VU
Black duiker	Mammalia	Artiodactyla	Bovidae	Cephalophus	—	LC
Bobiri reed frog	Amphibia	Anura	Hyperoliidae	Hyperolius	—	EN
Bongo	Mammalia	Artiodactyla	Bovidae	Tragelaphus	—	NT
Boutry River frog	Amphibia	Anura	Petropedetidae	Phrynobatrachus	—	LC
Broad-banded Grass Frog	Amphibia	Anura	Ptychadenidae	Ptychadena	—	LC
Brown Banana Frog	Amphibia	Anura	Hyperoliidae	Afrixalus	—	LC
Buettikofer's epauletted fruit bat	Mammalia	Chiroptera	Pteropodidae	Epomops	—	LC
Bushbuck	Mammalia	Artiodactyla	Bovidae	Tragelaphus	—	LC
Campbell's monkey	Mammalia	Primates	Cercopithecidae	Cercopithecus	—	LC
Cansdale's swamp rat	Mammalia	Rodentia	Muridae	Malacomys	—	LC
Cardioglossa leucomystax	Amphibia	Anura	Arthroleptidae	Cardioglossa	—	LC
Chabanaud's River frog	Amphibia	Anura	Petropedetidae	Phrynobatrachus	—	LC
Chimpanzee	Mammalia	Primates	Hominidae	Pan	—	EN
Climbing shrew	Mammalia	Soricomorpha	Soricidae	Suncus	—	LC
Coast River Frog	Amphibia	Anura	Petropedetidae	Phrynobatrachus	—	LC
Common kusimanse	Mammalia	Carnivora	Herpestidae	Crossarchus	—	LC
Crab-eating mongoose	Mammalia	Carnivora	Herpestidae	Herpestes	—	LC
Crested porcupine	Mammalia	Rodentia	Hystricidae	Hystrix	—	LC
Crosse's shrew	Mammalia	Soricomorpha	Soricidae	Crocidura	—	LC
Crowned bullfrog	Amphibia	Anura	Dicroglossidae	Hoplobatrachus	—	LC
Cyclops roundleaf bat	Mammalia	Chiroptera	Hipposideridae	Hipposideros	—	LC
Defua rat	Mammalia	Rodentia	Muridae	Dephomys	—	LC
Demidoff's Dwarf Galago	Mammalia	Primates	Galagidae	Galagoides	—	LC
Diana monkey	Mammalia	Primates	Cercopithecidae	Cercopithecus	—	VU
Dotted reed frog	Amphibia	Anura	Hyperoliidae	Hyperolius	—	LC
Dwarf free-tailed bat	Mammalia	Chiroptera	Molossidae	Mops	—	LC
Dwarf slit-faced bat	Mammalia	Chiroptera	Nycteridae	Nycteris	—	LC
Edward's swamp rat	Mammalia	Rodentia	Muridae	Malacomys	—	LC
Egyptian mongoose	Mammalia	Carnivora	Herpestidae	Herpestes	—	LC
Fire-footed rope squirrel	Mammalia	Rodentia	Sciuridae	Funisciurus	—	LC
Forest hog	Mammalia	Artiodactyla	Suidae	Hylochoerus	—	LC
Franquet's epauletted fruit bat	Mammalia	Chiroptera	Pteropodidae	Epomops	—	LC
Fraser's musk shrew	Mammalia	Soricomorpha	Soricidae	Crocidura	—	LC
Gambian epauletted fruit bat	Mammalia	Chiroptera	Pteropodidae	Epomophorus	—	LC
Gambian mongoose	Mammalia	Carnivora	Herpestidae	Mungos	—	LC
Gambian slit-faced bat	Mammalia	Chiroptera	Nycteridae	Nycteris	—	LC
Geotrypetes seraphini	Amphibia	Gymnophiona	Dermophiidae	Geotrypetes	—	LC
Giant ground pangolin	Mammalia	Pholidota	Manidae	Manis	—	NT
Giant pouched rat	Mammalia	Rodentia	Nesomyidae	Cricetomys	—	LC
Giant roundleaf bat	Mammalia	Chiroptera	Hipposideridae	Hipposideros	—	LC
Graphiurus nagtglasii	Mammalia	Rodentia	Gliridae	Graphiurus	—	LC
Greater cane rat	Mammalia	Rodentia	Thryonomyidae	Thryonomys	—	LC
Green bush squirrel	Mammalia	Rodentia	Sciuridae	Paraxerus	—	LC
Guinea multimammate mouse	Mammalia	Rodentia	Muridae	Mastomys	—	LC
Guinea snout-burrower	Amphibia	Anura	Hemisotidae	Hemisus	—	LC
Guinean Arvicanthis	Mammalia	Rodentia	Muridae	Arvicanthis	—	LC
Hairy slit-faced bat	Mammalia	Chiroptera	Nycteridae	Nycteris	—	LC
Halcyon horseshoe bat	Mammalia	Chiroptera	Rhinolophidae	Rhinolophus	—	LC
Hammer-headed fruit bat	Mammalia	Chiroptera	Pteropodidae	Hypsignathus	—	LC
Honey badger	Mammalia	Carnivora	Mustelidae	Mellivora	—	LC
House rat	Mammalia	Rodentia	Muridae	Rattus	—	LC
Hylarana albolabris	Amphibia	Anura	Ranidae	Hylarana	—	LC
Hylarana occidentalis	Amphibia	Anura	Ranidae	Hylarana	—	EN
Hyperolius concolor	Amphibia	Anura	Hyperoliidae	Hyperolius	—	LC
Hyperolius igbettensis	Amphibia	Anura	Hyperoliidae	Hyperolius	—	LC
Hyperolius picturatus	Amphibia	Anura	Hyperoliidae	Hyperolius	—	LC
Intermediate slit-faced bat	Mammalia	Chiroptera	Nycteridae	Nycteris	—	NT
Ivory Coast running frog	Amphibia	Anura	Hyperoliidae	Kassina	—	VU
Johnston's genet	Mammalia	Carnivora	Viverridae	Genetta	—	VU
King genet	Mammalia	Carnivora	Viverridae	Genetta	—	DD
Lander's horseshoe bat	Mammalia	Chiroptera	Rhinolophidae	Rhinolophus	—	LC
Large slit-faced bat	Mammalia	Chiroptera	Nycteridae	Nycteris	—	LC
Large-eared slit-faced bat	Mammalia	Chiroptera	Nycteridae	Nycteris	—	LC
Leopard	Mammalia	Carnivora	Felidae	Panthera	—	NT
Leptopelis occidentalis	Amphibia	Anura	Hyperoliidae	Leptopelis	—	NT
Leptopelis spiritusnoctis	Amphibia	Anura	Hyperoliidae	Leptopelis	—	LC
Lesser spot-nosed monkey	Mammalia	Primates	Cercopithecidae	Cercopithecus	—	LC
Lesser woolly bat	Mammalia	Chiroptera	Vespertilionidae	Kerivoula	—	LC
Lime reed frog	Amphibia	Anura	Hyperoliidae	Hyperolius	—	LC
Little collared fruit bat	Mammalia	Chiroptera	Pteropodidae	Myonycteris	—	LC
Long-eared scaly-tailed flying squirrel	Mammalia	Rodentia	Anomaluridae	Idiurus	—	LC
Lord Derby's flying squirrel	Mammalia	Rodentia	Anomaluridae	Anomalurus	—	LC
Lorrain dormouse	Mammalia	Rodentia	Gliridae	Graphiurus	—	LC
Marsh mongoose	Mammalia	Carnivora	Herpestidae	Atilax	—	LC
Mascarene Grass Frog	Amphibia	Anura	Ptychadenidae	Ptychadena	—	LC
Maxwell's duiker	Mammalia	Artiodactyla	Bovidae	Philantomba	—	LC
Moloney's flat-headed bat	Mammalia	Chiroptera	Vespertilionidae	Mimetillus	—	LC
Mouselike pipistrelle	Mammalia	Chiroptera	Vespertilionidae	Hypsugo	—	DD
Mus musculoides	Mammalia	Rodentia	Muridae	Mus	—	LC
Natal multimammate mouse	Mammalia	Rodentia	Muridae	Mastomys	—	LC
Noack's roundleaf bat	Mammalia	Chiroptera	Hipposideridae	Hipposideros	—	LC
Nut-colored yellow bat	Mammalia	Chiroptera	Vespertilionidae	Scotophilus	—	LC
Ogilby's duiker	Mammalia	Artiodactyla	Bovidae	Cephalophus	—	LC
Olive colobus	Mammalia	Primates	Cercopithecidae	Procolobus	—	NT
Olivier's shrew	Mammalia	Soricomorpha	Soricidae	Crocidura	—	LC
Pel's flying squirrel	Mammalia	Rodentia	Anomaluridae	Anomalurus	—	DD
Pel's pouched bat	Mammalia	Chiroptera	Emballonuridae	Saccolaimus	—	NT
Peters's dwarf epauletted fruit bat	Mammalia	Chiroptera	Pteropodidae	Micropteropus	—	LC
Peters's mouse	Mammalia	Rodentia	Muridae	Mus	—	LC
Phrynobatrachus alleni	Amphibia	Anura	Petropedetidae	Phrynobatrachus	—	NT
Phrynobatrachus ghanensis	Amphibia	Anura	Petropedetidae	Phrynobatrachus	—	EN
Phrynobatrachus liberiensis	Amphibia	Anura	Petropedetidae	Phrynobatrachus	—	NT
Phrynobatrachus tokba	Amphibia	Anura	Petropedetidae	Phrynobatrachus	—	LC
Phrynobatrachus villiersi	Amphibia	Anura	Petropedetidae	Phrynobatrachus	—	VU
Pohle's fruit bat	Mammalia	Chiroptera	Pteropodidae	Scotonycteris	—	VU
Potto	Mammalia	Primates	Lorisidae	Perodicticus	—	LC
Ptychadena longirostris	Amphibia	Anura	Ranidae	Ptychadena	—	LC
Ptychadena pumilio	Amphibia	Anura	Ranidae	Ptychadena	—	LC
Ptychadena superciliaris	Amphibia	Anura	Ranidae	Ptychadena	—	NT
Railer bat	Mammalia	Chiroptera	Molossidae	Mops	—	LC
Red river hog	Mammalia	Artiodactyla	Suidae	Potamochoerus	—	LC
Ringed River frog	Amphibia	Anura	Petropedetidae	Phrynobatrachus	—	EN
Roloway monkey	Mammalia	Primates	Cercopithecidae	Cercopithecus	—	EN
Royal antelope	Mammalia	Artiodactyla	Bovidae	Neotragus	—	LC
Russet free-tailed bat	Mammalia	Chiroptera	Molossidae	Chaerephon	—	NT
Rusty-bellied brush-furred rat	Mammalia	Rodentia	Muridae	Lophuromys	—	LC
Schiotz's reed frog	Amphibia	Anura	Hyperoliidae	Hyperolius	—	VU
Shining thicket rat	Mammalia	Rodentia	Muridae	Grammomys	—	LC
Sierra Leone free-tailed bat	Mammalia	Chiroptera	Molossidae	Mops	—	LC
Slender mongoose	Mammalia	Carnivora	Herpestidae	Galerella	—	LC
Slender-tailed squirrel	Mammalia	Rodentia	Sciuridae	Protoxerus	—	DD
Small sun squirrel	Mammalia	Rodentia	Sciuridae	Heliosciurus	—	DD
Sooty roundleaf bat	Mammalia	Chiroptera	Hipposideridae	Hipposideros	—	NT
Spotted-necked otter	Mammalia	Carnivora	Mustelidae	Hydrictis	—	LC
Spurrell's free-tailed bat	Mammalia	Chiroptera	Molossidae	Mops	—	LC
Spurrell's woolly bat	Mammalia	Chiroptera	Vespertilionidae	Kerivoula	—	LC
Straw-coloured fruit bat	Mammalia	Chiroptera	Pteropodidae	Eidolon	—	NT
Stream reed frog	Amphibia	Anura	Hyperoliidae	Hyperolius	—	VU
Striped ground squirrel	Mammalia	Rodentia	Sciuridae	Xerus	—	LC
Sundevall's roundleaf bat	Mammalia	Chiroptera	Hipposideridae	Hipposideros	—	LC
Temminck's striped mouse	Mammalia	Rodentia	Muridae	Hybomys	—	LC
Therese's shrew	Mammalia	Soricomorpha	Soricidae	Crocidura	—	LC
Thomas's Dwarf Galago	Mammalia	Primates	Galagidae	Galago	—	LC
Tiny pipistrelle	Mammalia	Chiroptera	Vespertilionidae	Pipistrellus	—	LC
Togo toad	Amphibia	Anura	Bufonidae	Amietophrynus	—	NT
Trevor's free-tailed bat	Mammalia	Chiroptera	Molossidae	Mops	—	VU
Tropical clawed frog	Amphibia	Anura	Pipidae	Xenopus	—	LC
Tullberg's Praomys	Mammalia	Rodentia	Muridae	Praomys	—	LC
Typical striped grass mouse	Mammalia	Rodentia	Muridae	Lemniscomys	—	LC
Veldkamp's dwarf epauletted fruit bat	Mammalia	Chiroptera	Pteropodidae	Nanonycteris	—	LC
Victoria Ridged Frog	Amphibia	Anura	Ranidae	Ptychadena	—	LC
Water chevrotain	Mammalia	Artiodactyla	Tragulidae	Hyemoschus	—	LC
West African large-spotted genet	Mammalia	Carnivora	Viverridae	Genetta	—	LC
West African long-tailed shrew	Mammalia	Soricomorpha	Soricidae	Crocidura	—	LC
West African Praomys	Mammalia	Rodentia	Muridae	Praomys	—	LC
West African pygmy shrew	Mammalia	Soricomorpha	Soricidae	Crocidura	—	LC
West African red colobus	Mammalia	Primates	Cercopithecidae	Procolobus	—	EN
West African shaggy rat	Mammalia	Rodentia	Muridae	Dasymys	—	LC
Western Palm Squirrel	Mammalia	Rodentia	Sciuridae	Epixerus	—	LC
Western tree hyrax	Mammalia	Hyracoidea	Procaviidae	Dendrohyrax	—	LC
White-tailed mongoose	Mammalia	Carnivora	Herpestidae	Ichneumia	—	LC
White-thighed colobus	Mammalia	Primates	Cercopithecidae	Colobus	—	VU
White-winged serotine	Mammalia	Chiroptera	Vespertilionidae	Neoromicia	—	LC
Woermann's bat	Mammalia	Chiroptera	Pteropodidae	Megaloglossus	—	LC
Yellow-backed duiker	Mammalia	Artiodactyla	Bovidae	Cephalophus	—	LC
Yellow-winged bat	Mammalia	Chiroptera	Megadermatidae	Lavia	—	LC
Zenker's fruit bat	Mammalia	Chiroptera	Pteropodidae	Scotonycteris	—	LC

Conservation status criteria

The following tags are used to highlight each species' conservation status as assessed by the IUCN.

Tag	Status	Description	Category
EX	Extinct	No known individuals remaining.	Extinct
EW	Extinct in the Wild	Known only to survive in captivity, or as a naturalized population outside its historic range.	Extinct
CR	Critically Endangered	Extremely high risk of extinction in the wild.	Threatened
EN	Endangered	High risk of extinction in the wild.	Threatened
VU	Vulnerable	High risk of endangerment in the wild.	Threatened
NT	Near Threatened	Likely to become endangered in the near future.	At lower risk
LC	Least Concern	Lowest risk. Does not qualify for a higher risk category. Widespread and abundant taxa are included in this category.	At lower risk
DD	Data Deficient	Not enough data to make an assessment of its risk of extinction.	Other
NE	Not Evaluated	Has not yet been evaluated against the criteria.	Other

== See also ==
- List of amphibians of Ghana
- List of birds of Ghana
- List of butterflies of Ghana
- List of mammals of Ghana
- List of moths of Ghana
- List of national parks of Ghana
- List of reptiles of Ghana
- List of reptiles of Morocco
