= List of mammals of Ghana =

This is a list of the mammal species recorded in Ghana. Of the mammal species in Ghana, five are endangered, eleven are vulnerable, and fourteen are near threatened.

The following tags are used to highlight each species' conservation status as assessed by the International Union for Conservation of Nature:

EX	Extinct	No reasonable doubt that the last individual has died.
EW	Extinct in the wild	Known only to survive in captivity or as a naturalized populations well outside its previous range.
CR	Critically endangered	The species is in imminent risk of extinction in the wild.
EN	Endangered	The species is facing an extremely high risk of extinction in the wild.
VU	Vulnerable	The species is facing a high risk of extinction in the wild.
NT	Near threatened	The species does not meet any of the criteria that would categorise it as risking extinction but it is likely to do so in the future.
LC	Least concern	There are no current identifiable risks to the species.
DD	Data deficient	There is inadequate information to make an assessment of the risks to this species.

Some species were assessed using an earlier set of criteria. Species assessed using this system have the following instead of near threatened and least concern categories:

LR/cd	Lower risk/conservation dependent	Species which were the focus of conservation programmes and may have moved into a higher risk category if that programme was discontinued.
LR/nt	Lower risk/near threatened	Species which are close to being classified as vulnerable but are not the subject of conservation programmes.
LR/lc	Lower risk/least concern	Species for which there are no identifiable risks.

== Order: Tubulidentata (aardvarks) ==
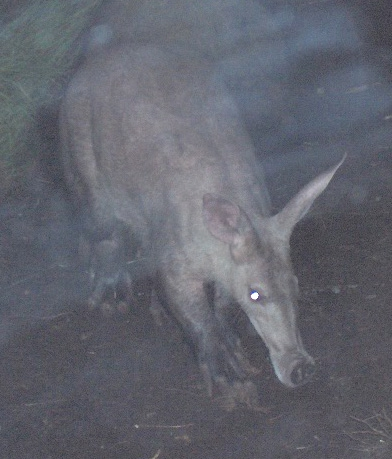
Aardvark

The order Tubulidentata consists of a single species, the aardvark. Tubulidentata are characterised by their teeth which lack a pulp cavity and form thin tubes which are continuously worn down and replaced.

- Family: Orycteropodidae
  - Genus: Orycteropus
    - Aardvark, O. afer LC

== Order: Hyracoidea (hyraxes) ==
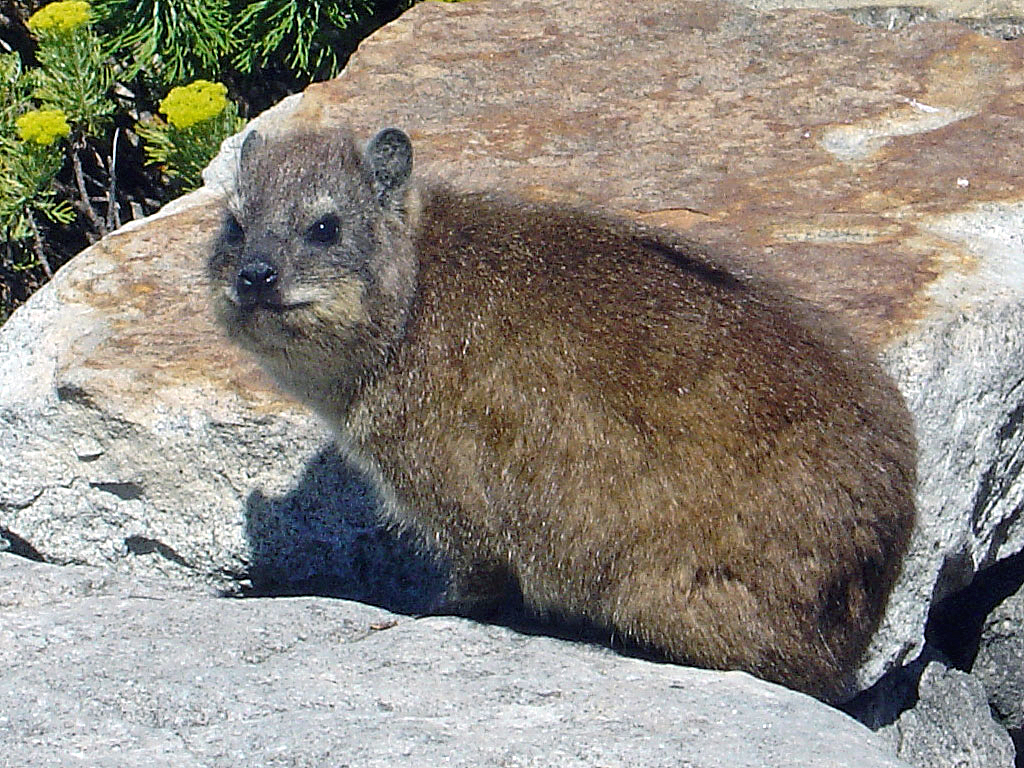
Cape hyrax

The hyraxes are any of four species of fairly small, thickset, herbivorous mammals in the order Hyracoidea. About the size of a domestic cat they are well-furred, with rounded bodies and a stumpy tail. They are native to Africa and the Middle East.

- Family: Procaviidae (hyraxes)
  - Genus: Dendrohyrax
    - Western tree hyrax, D. dorsalis LC
  - Genus: Procavia
    - Cape hyrax, P. capensis LC

== Order: Proboscidea (elephants) ==
The elephants comprise three living species and are the largest living land animals.

- Family: Elephantidae (elephants)
  - Genus: Loxodonta
    - African forest elephant, L. cyclotis CR

== Order: Sirenia (manatees and dugongs) ==
Sirenia is an order of fully aquatic, herbivorous mammals that inhabit rivers, estuaries, coastal marine waters, swamps, and marine wetlands. All four species are endangered.

- Family: Trichechidae
  - Genus: Trichechus
    - African manatee, Trichechus senegalensis VU

== Order: Primates ==
The order Primates contains humans and their closest relatives: lemurs, lorisoids, tarsiers, monkeys, and apes.

- Suborder: Strepsirrhini
  - Infraorder: Lemuriformes
    - Superfamily: Lorisoidea
      - Family: Lorisidae
        - Genus: Perodicticus
          - Potto, Perodicticus potto LR/lc
      - Family: Galagidae
        - Genus: Galagoides
        - Prince Demidoff's bushbaby, Galagoides demidovii LR/lc
        - Genus: Galago
          - Senegal bushbaby, Galago senegalensis LR/lc
- Suborder: Haplorhini
  - Infraorder: Simiiformes
    - Parvorder: Catarrhini
      - Superfamily: Cercopithecoidea
        - Family: Cercopithecidae (Old World monkeys)
          - Genus: Erythrocebus
            - Patas monkey, Erythrocebus patas LR/lc
          - Genus: Chlorocebus
            - Green monkey, Chlorocebus sabaeus LC
            - Tantalus monkey, Chlorocebus tantalus LC
          - Genus: Cercopithecus
            - Campbell's mona monkey, Cercopithecus campbelli LR/lc
            - Diana monkey, Cercopithecus diana EN
            - Mona monkey, Cercopithecus mona LR/lc
            - Lesser spot-nosed monkey, Cercopithecus petaurista LR/lc
          - Genus: Papio
            - Olive baboon, Papio anubis LR/lc
          - Genus: Cercocebus
            - Sooty mangabey, Cercocebus atys LR/nt
          - Subfamily: Colobinae
            - Genus: Colobus
              - Ursine colobus, Colobus vellerosus VU
            - Genus: Procolobus
              - Red colobus, Procolobus badius EN
              - Olive colobus, Procolobus verus LR/nt
      - Superfamily: Hominoidea
        - Family: Hominidae (great apes)
          - Subfamily: Homininae
            - Tribe: Panini
              - Genus: Pan
                - Common chimpanzee, Pan troglodytes EN

== Order: Rodentia (rodents) ==
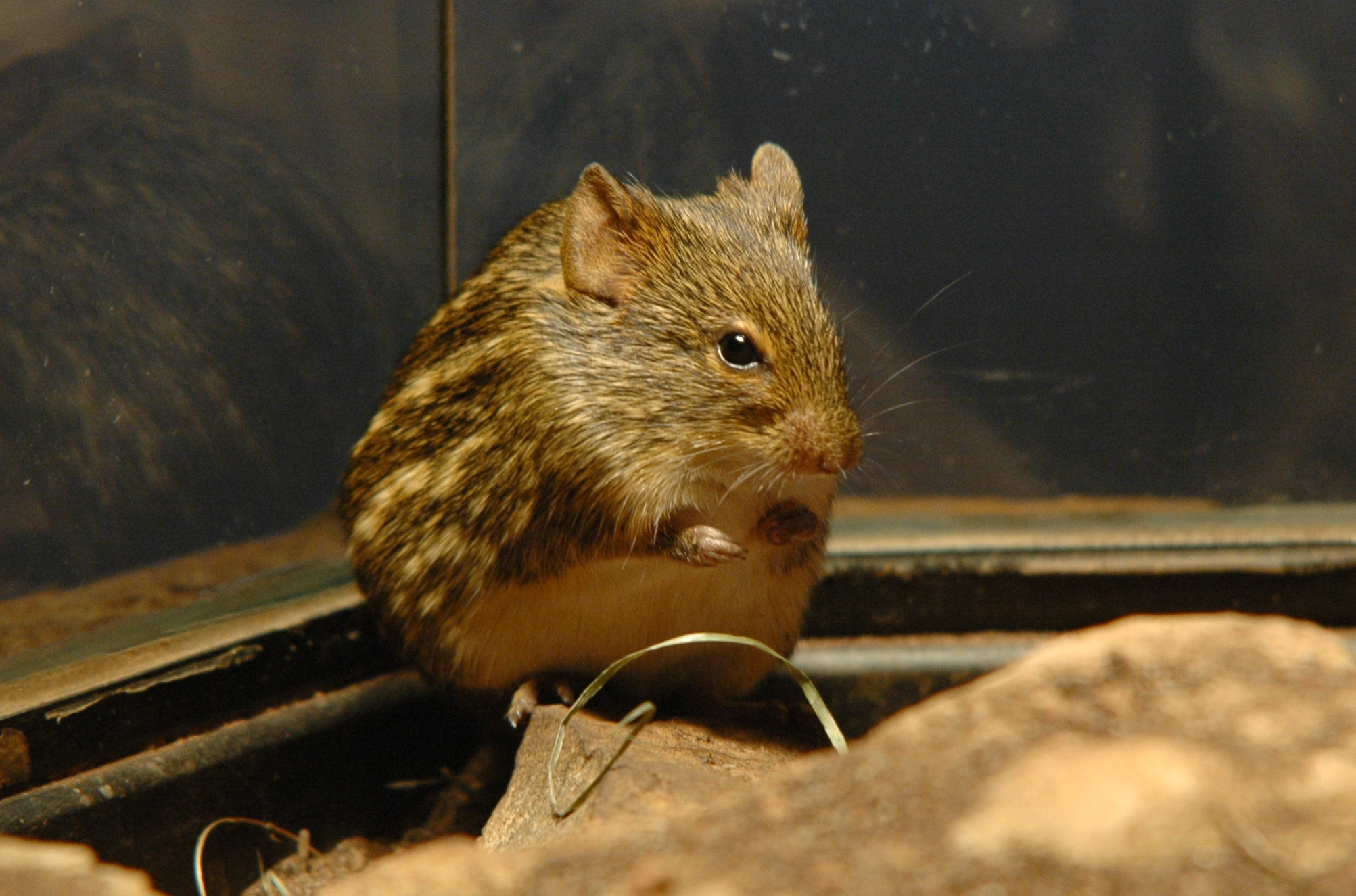
Typical striped grass mouse

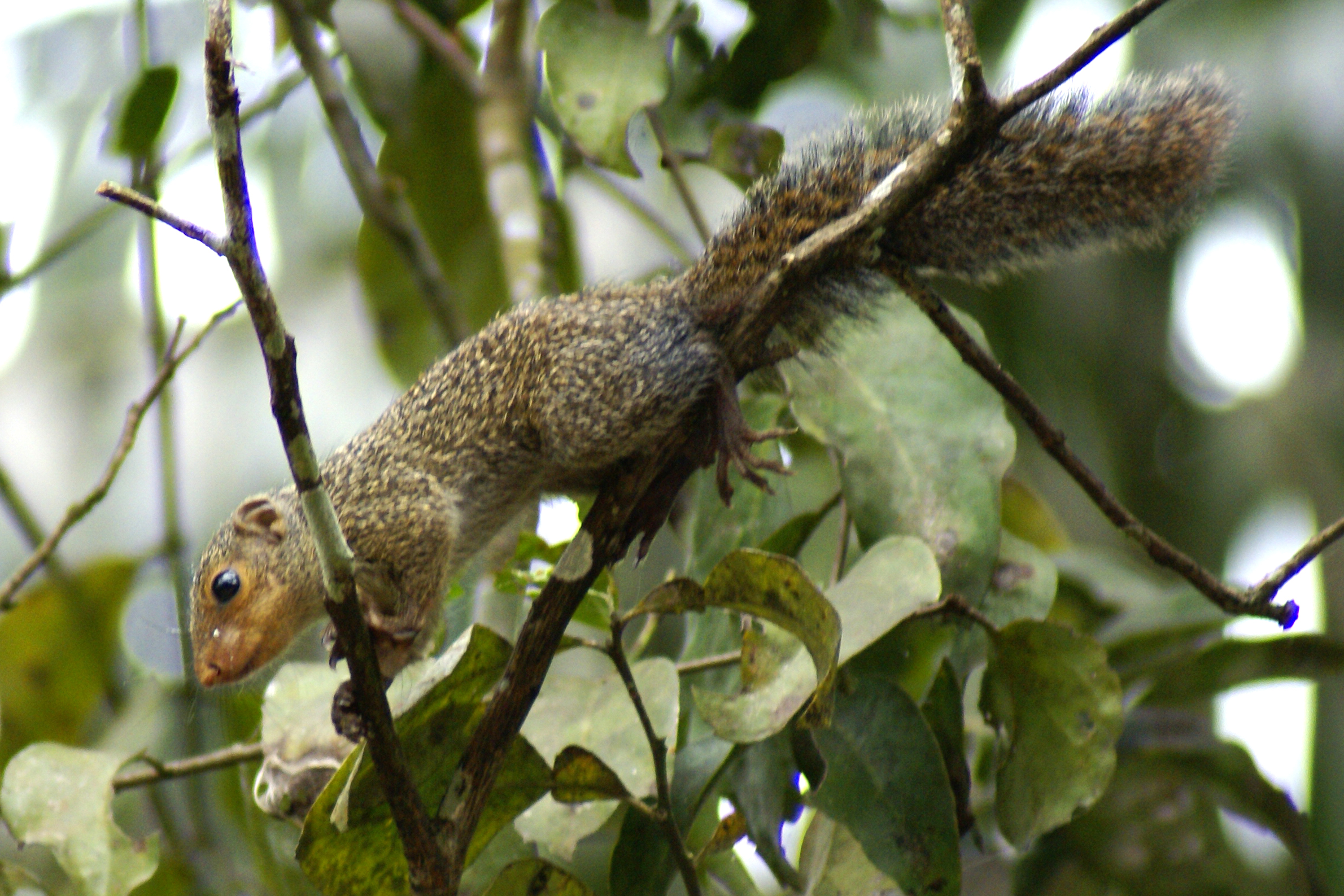
Sun squirrel (Heliosciurus)

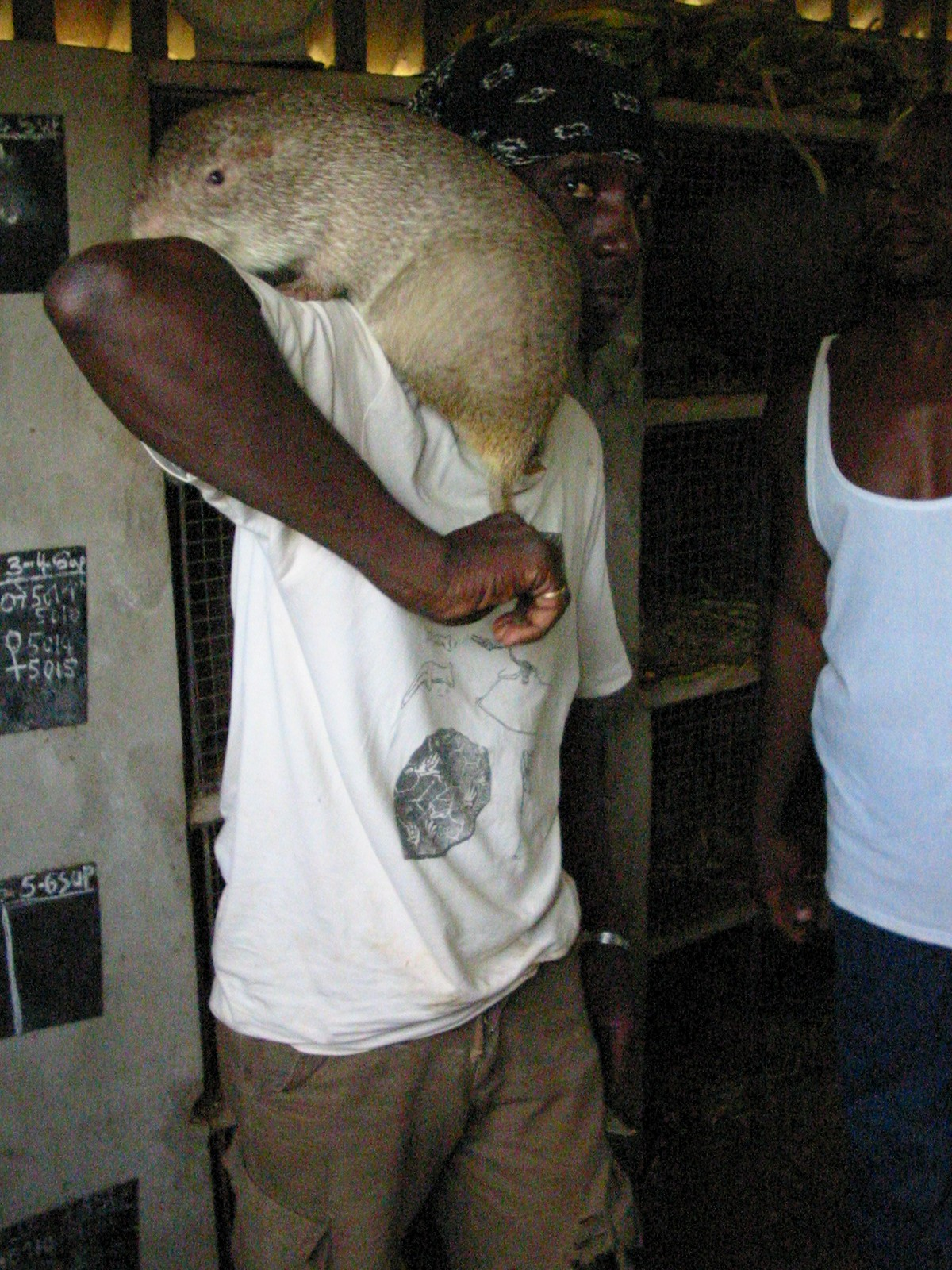
Greater cane rat

Rodents make up the largest order of mammals, with over 40% of mammalian species. They have two incisors in the upper and lower jaw which grow continually and must be kept short by gnawing. Most rodents are small though the capybara can weigh up to 45 kg (99 lb).

- Suborder: Hystricognathi
  - Family: Bathyergidae
    - Genus: Fukomys
      - Ghana mole-rat, Fukomys zechi LC
  - Family: Hystricidae (Old World porcupines)
    - Genus: Atherurus
      - African brush-tailed porcupine, Atherurus africanus LC
    - Genus: Hystrix
      - Crested porcupine, Hystrix cristata LC
  - Family: Thryonomyidae (cane rats)
    - Genus: Thryonomys
      - Greater cane rat, Thryonomys swinderianus LC
- Suborder: Sciurognathi
  - Family: Anomaluridae
    - Subfamily: Anomalurinae
      - Genus: Anomalurus
        - Beecroft's scaly-tailed squirrel, Anomalurus beecrofti LC
        - Lord Derby's scaly-tailed squirrel, Anomalurus derbianus LC
        - Pel's scaly-tailed squirrel, Anomalurus pelii NT
    - Subfamily: Zenkerellinae
      - Genus: Idiurus
        - Long-eared flying mouse, Idiurus macrotis LC
  - Family: Sciuridae (squirrels)
    - Subfamily: Xerinae
      - Tribe: Xerini
        - Genus: Xerus
          - Striped ground squirrel, Xerus erythropus LC
      - Tribe: Protoxerini
        - Genus: Epixerus
          - Western palm squirrel, Epixerus ebii DD
        - Genus: Funisciurus
          - Red-cheeked rope squirrel, Funisciurus leucogenys DD
          - Fire-footed rope squirrel, Funisciurus pyrropus LC
          - Kintampo rope squirrel, Funisciurus substriatus DD
        - Genus: Heliosciurus
          - Gambian sun squirrel, Heliosciurus gambianus LC
          - Small sun squirrel, Heliosciurus punctatus DD
          - Red-legged sun squirrel, Heliosciurus rufobrachium LC
        - Genus: Paraxerus
          - Green bush squirrel, Paraxerus poensis LC
        - Genus: Protoxerus
          - Slender-tailed squirrel, Protoxerus aubinnii DD
          - Forest giant squirrel, Protoxerus stangeri LC
  - Family: Gliridae (dormice)
    - Subfamily: Graphiurinae
      - Genus: Graphiurus
        - Jentink's dormouse, Graphiurus crassicaudatus DD
        - Kellen's dormouse, Graphiurus kelleni LC
        - Lorrain dormouse, Graphiurus lorraineus LC
        - Nagtglas's African dormouse, Graphiurus nagtglasii LC
  - Family: Nesomyidae
    - Subfamily: Dendromurinae
      - Genus: Steatomys
        - Northwestern fat mouse, Steatomys caurinus LC
        - Jackson's fat mouse, Steatomys jacksoni VU
    - Subfamily: Cricetomyinae
      - Genus: Cricetomys
        - Emin's pouched rat, Cricetomys emini LC
        - Gambian pouched rat, Cricetomys gambianus LC
  - Family: Muridae (mice, rats, voles, gerbils, hamsters, etc.)
    - Subfamily: Deomyinae
      - Genus: Acomys
        - Johan's spiny mouse, Acomys johannis LC
      - Genus: Lophuromys
        - Rusty-bellied brush-furred rat, Lophuromys sikapusi LC
      - Genus: Uranomys
        - Rudd's mouse, Uranomys ruddi LC
    - Subfamily: Gerbillinae
      - Genus: Gerbilliscus
        - Guinean gerbil, Gerbilliscus guineae LC
        - Kemp's gerbil, Gerbilliscus kempi LC
      - Genus: Taterillus
        - Gracile tateril, Taterillus gracilis LC
    - Subfamily: Murinae
      - Genus: Arvicanthis
        - African grass rat, Arvicanthis niloticus LC
        - Guinean grass rat, Arvicanthis rufinus LC
      - Genus: Dasymys
        - West African shaggy rat, Dasymys rufulus LC
      - Genus: Dephomys
        - Defua rat, Dephomys defua LC
      - Genus: Grammomys
        - Eastern rainforest grammomys, Grammomys kuru LC
      - Genus: Hybomys
        - Temminck's striped mouse, Hybomys trivirgatus LC
      - Genus: Hylomyscus
        - Allen's wood mouse, Hylomyscus alleni LC
        - Baer's wood mouse, Hylomyscus baeri EN
      - Genus: Lemniscomys
        - Bellier's striped grass mouse, Lemniscomys bellieri LC
        - Typical striped grass mouse, Lemniscomys striatus LC
        - Heuglin's striped grass mouse, Lemniscomys zebra LC
      - Genus: Malacomys
        - Cansdale's swamp rat, Malacomys cansdalei LC
        - Edward's swamp rat, Malacomys edwardsi LC
      - Genus: Mastomys
        - Guinea multimammate mouse, Mastomys erythroleucus LC
        - Natal multimammate mouse, Mastomys natalensis LC
      - Genus: Mus
        - Hausa mouse, Mus haussa LC
        - Matthey's mouse, Mus mattheyi LC
        - Peters's mouse, Mus setulosus LC
      - Genus: Mylomys
        - African groove-toothed rat, Mylomys dybowskii LC
      - Genus: Oenomys
        - Ghana rufous-nosed rat, Oenomys ornatus DD
      - Genus: Praomys
        - Dalton's mouse, Praomys daltoni LC
        - Deroo's mouse, Praomys derooi LC
        - Forest soft-furred mouse, Praomys rostratus LC
        - Tullberg's soft-furred mouse, Praomys tullbergi LC

== Order: Lagomorpha (lagomorphs) ==
The lagomorphs comprise two families, Leporidae (hares and rabbits), and Ochotonidae (pikas). Though they can resemble rodents, and were classified as a superfamily in that order until the early 20th century, they have since been considered a separate order. They differ from rodents in a number of physical characteristics, such as having four incisors in the upper jaw rather than two.

- Family: Leporidae (rabbits, hares)
  - Genus: Lepus
    - African savanna hare, Lepus microtis LC

== Order: Erinaceomorpha (hedgehogs and gymnures) ==
The order Erinaceomorpha contains a single family, Erinaceidae, which comprise the hedgehogs and gymnures. The hedgehogs are easily recognised by their spines while gymnures look more like large rats.

- Family: Erinaceidae (hedgehogs)
  - Subfamily: Erinaceinae
    - Genus: Atelerix
      - Four-toed hedgehog, Atelerix albiventris LR/lc

== Order: Soricomorpha (shrews, moles, and solenodons) ==
The "shrew-forms" are insectivorous mammals. The shrews and solenodons closely resemble mice while the moles are stout-bodied burrowers.

- Family: Soricidae (shrews)
  - Subfamily: Crocidurinae
    - Genus: Crocidura
      - Buettikofer's shrew, Crocidura buettikoferi LC
      - Crosse's shrew, Crocidura crossei LC
      - Fox's shrew, Crocidura foxi LC
      - Bicolored musk shrew, Crocidura fuscomurina LC
      - Large-headed shrew, Crocidura grandiceps NT
      - Lamotte's shrew, Crocidura lamottei LC
      - West African long-tailed shrew, Crocidura muricauda LC
      - West African pygmy shrew, Crocidura obscurior LC
      - African giant shrew, Crocidura olivieri LC
      - Fraser's musk shrew, Crocidura poensis LC
      - Therese's shrew, Crocidura theresae LC
      - Savanna path shrew, Crocidura viaria LC
    - Genus: Sylvisorex
      - Climbing shrew, Suncus megalura LC

== Order: Chiroptera (bats) ==
The bats' most distinguishing feature is that their forelimbs are developed as wings, making them the only mammals capable of flight. Bat species account for about 20% of all mammals.

- Family: Pteropodidae (flying foxes, Old World fruit bats)
  - Genus: Lissonycteris
    - Angolan rousette, Lissonycteris angolensis LC
  - Subfamily: Pteropodinae
    - Genus: Eidolon
      - Straw-coloured fruit bat, Eidolon helvum LC
    - Genus: Epomophorus
      - Gambian epauletted fruit bat, Epomophorus gambianus LC
    - Genus: Epomops
      - Buettikofer's epauletted fruit bat, Epomops buettikoferi LC
      - Franquet's epauletted fruit bat, Epomops franqueti LC
    - Genus: Hypsignathus
      - Hammer-headed bat, Hypsignathus monstrosus LC
    - Genus: Micropteropus
      - Peters's dwarf epauletted fruit bat, Micropteropus pusillus LC
    - Genus: Myonycteris
      - Little collared fruit bat, Myonycteris torquata LC
    - Genus: Nanonycteris
      - Veldkamp's dwarf epauletted fruit bat, Nanonycteris veldkampi LC
    - Genus: Rousettus
      - Egyptian fruit bat, Rousettus aegyptiacus LC
    - Genus: Scotonycteris
      - Pohle's fruit bat, Scotonycteris ophiodon EN
      - Zenker's fruit bat, Scotonycteris zenkeri NT
- Subfamily: Macroglossinae
  - Genus: Megaloglossus
    - Woermann's bat, Megaloglossus woermanni LC
- Family: Vespertilionidae
  - Subfamily: Kerivoulinae
    - Genus: Kerivoula
      - Lesser woolly bat, Kerivoula lanosa LC
      - Spurrell's woolly bat, Kerivoula phalaena NT
- Subfamily: Myotinae
  - Genus: Myotis
    - Rufous mouse-eared bat, Myotis bocagii LC
- Subfamily: Vespertilioninae
  - Genus: Glauconycteris
    - Beatrix's bat, Glauconycteris beatrix NT
    - Abo bat, Glauconycteris poensis LC
    - Pied bat, Glauconycteris superba VU
    - Butterfly bat, Glauconycteris variegata LC
  - Genus: Hypsugo
    - Mouselike pipistrelle, Hypsugo musciculus DD
  - Genus: Mimetillus
    - Moloney's mimic bat, Mimetillus moloneyi LC
  - Genus: Nycticeinops
    - Schlieffen's bat, Nycticeinops schlieffeni LC
  - Genus: Pipistrellus
    - Dark-brown serotine, Pipistrellus brunneus NT
    - Cape serotine, Pipistrellus capensis LC
    - Tiny serotine, Pipistrellus guineensis LC
    - Aellen's pipistrelle, Pipistrellus inexspectatus DD
    - Tiny pipistrelle, Pipistrellus nanulus LC
    - Banana pipistrelle, Pipistrellus nanus LC
    - Rendall's serotine, Pipistrellus rendalli LC
    - Rüppell's pipistrelle, Pipistrellus rueppellii LC
    - Rusty pipistrelle, Pipistrellus rusticus LC
    - Somali serotine, Pipistrellus somalicus LC
    - White-winged serotine, Pipistrellus tenuipinnis LC
  - Genus: Scotoecus
    - Light-winged lesser house bat, Scotoecus albofuscus DD
    - Dark-winged lesser house bat, Scotoecus hirundo DD
  - Genus: Scotophilus
    - African yellow bat, Scotophilus dinganii LC
    - White-bellied yellow bat, Scotophilus leucogaster LC
    - Schreber's yellow bat, Scotophilus nigrita NT
    - Robbins's yellow bat, Scotophilus nucella VU
    - Nut-colored yellow bat, Scotophilus nux LC
    - Greenish yellow bat, Scotophilus viridis LC
- Family: Molossidae
  - Genus: Tadarida
    - Duke of Abruzzi's free-tailed bat, Tadarida aloysiisabaudiae NT
    - Sierra Leone free-tailed bat, Tadarida brachypterus LC
    - Chapin's free-tailed bat, Tadarida chapini DD
    - Angolan free-tailed bat, Tadarida condylurus LC
    - Mongalla free-tailed bat, Tadarida demonstrator NT
    - Lappet-eared free-tailed bat, Tadarida major LC
    - Midas free-tailed bat, Tadarida midas LC
    - Dwarf free-tailed bat, Tadarida nanulus LC
    - Nigerian free-tailed bat, Tadarida nigeriae LC
    - Peterson's free-tailed bat, Tadarida petersoni VU
    - Little free-tailed bat, Tadarida pumila LC
    - Russet free-tailed bat, Tadarida russata NT
    - Spurrell's free-tailed bat, Tadarida spurrelli LC
    - Railer bat, Tadarida thersites LC
    - Trevor's free-tailed bat, Tadarida trevori VU
  - Genus: Myopterus
    - Bini free-tailed bat, Myopterus whitleyi LC
  - Genus: Otomops
    - Large-eared free-tailed bat, Otomops martiensseni NT
- Family: Emballonuridae
  - Genus: Coleura
    - African sheath-tailed bat, Coleura afra LC
  - Genus: Saccolaimus
    - Pel's pouched bat, Saccolaimus peli NT
  - Genus: Taphozous
    - Mauritian tomb bat, Taphozous mauritianus LC
    - Naked-rumped tomb bat, Taphozous nudiventris LC
    - Egyptian tomb bat, Taphozous perforatus LC
- Family: Nycteridae
  - Genus: Nycteris
    - Bate's slit-faced bat, Nycteris arge LC
    - Gambian slit-faced bat, Nycteris gambiensis LC
    - Large slit-faced bat, Nycteris grandis LC
    - Hairy slit-faced bat, Nycteris hispida LC
    - Intermediate slit-faced bat, Nycteris intermedia NT
    - Large-eared slit-faced bat, Nycteris macrotis LC
    - Dwarf slit-faced bat, Nycteris nana LC
    - Egyptian slit-faced bat, Nycteris thebaica LC
- Family: Megadermatidae
  - Genus: Lavia
    - Yellow-winged bat, Lavia frons LC
- Family: Rhinolophidae
  - Subfamily: Rhinolophinae
    - Genus: Rhinolophus
      - Halcyon horseshoe bat, Rhinolophus alcyone LC
      - Dent's horseshoe bat, Rhinolophus denti DD
      - Rüppell's horseshoe bat, Rhinolophus fumigatus LC
      - Lander's horseshoe bat, Rhinolophus landeri LC
  - Subfamily: Hipposiderinae
    - Genus: Hipposideros
      - Aba roundleaf bat, Hipposideros abae NT
      - Benito roundleaf bat, Hipposideros beatus LC
      - Sundevall's roundleaf bat, Hipposideros caffer LC
      - Cyclops roundleaf bat, Hipposideros cyclops LC
      - Sooty roundleaf bat, Hipposideros fuliginosus NT
      - Giant roundleaf bat, Hipposideros gigas LC
      - Jones's roundleaf bat, Hipposideros jonesi NT
      - Noack's roundleaf bat, Hipposideros ruber LC
- Family: Rhinopomatidae
  - Genus: Rhinopoma
    - Greater mouse-tailed bat, Rhinopoma microphyllum LC

== Order: Pholidota (pangolins) ==
The order Pholidota comprises the eight species of pangolin. Pangolins are anteaters and have the powerful claws, elongated snout and long tongue seen in the other unrelated anteater species.

- Family: Manidae
  - Genus: Manis
    - Giant pangolin, Manis gigantea LR/lc
    - Long-tailed pangolin, Manis tetradactyla LR/lc
    - Tree pangolin, Manis tricuspis LR/lc

== Order: Cetacea (whales) ==
The order Cetacea includes whales, dolphins and porpoises. They are the mammals most fully adapted to aquatic life with a spindle-shaped nearly hairless body, protected by a thick layer of blubber, and forelimbs and tail modified to provide propulsion underwater.

- Suborder: Mysticeti
  - Family: Balaenopteridae
    - Subfamily: Balaenopterinae
      - Genus: Balaenoptera
        - Common minke whale, Balaenoptera acutorostrata VU
        - Sei whale, Balaenoptera borealis EN
        - Bryde's whale, Balaenoptera brydei EN
        - Blue whale, Balaenoptera musculus EN
        - Fin whale, Balaenoptera physalus EN
    - Subfamily: Megapterinae
      - Genus: Megaptera
        - Humpback whale, Megaptera novaeangliae VU
- Suborder: Odontoceti
  - Superfamily: Platanistoidea
    - Family: Phocoenidae
      - Genus: Phocoena
        - Harbour porpoise, Phocoena phocoena VU
    - Family: Physeteridae
      - Genus: Physeter
        - Sperm whale, Physeter macrocephalus VU
    - Family: Kogiidae
      - Genus: Kogia
        - Pygmy sperm whale, Kogia breviceps DD
        - Dwarf sperm whale, Kogia sima DD
    - Family: Ziphidae
      - Genus: Mesoplodon
        - Blainville's beaked whale, Mesoplodon densirostris DD
        - Gervais' beaked whale, Mesoplodon europaeus DD
      - Genus: Ziphius
        - Cuvier's beaked whale, Ziphius cavirostris DD
    - Family: Delphinidae (marine dolphins)
      - Genus: Orcinus
        - Killer whale, Orcinus orca DD
        - Genus: Feresa
        - Pygmy killer whale, Feresa attenuata DD
        - Genus: Pseudorca
        - False killer whale, Pseudorca crassidens DD
      - Genus: Delphinus
        - Short-beaked common dolphin, Delphinus delphis LR/cd
        - Long-beaked common dolphin, Delphinus capensis DD
      - Genus: Sousa
        - Atlantic humpback dolphin, Sousa teuszii DD
      - Genus: Lagenodelphis
        - Fraser's dolphin, Lagenodelphis hosei DD
      - Genus: Stenella
        - Pantropical spotted dolphin, Stenella attenuata LR/cd
        - Clymene dolphin, Stenella clymene DD
        - Striped dolphin, Stenella coeruleoalba DD
        - Atlantic spotted dolphin, Stenella frontalis DD
        - Spinner dolphin, Stenella longirostris LR/cd
      - Genus: Steno
        - Rough-toothed dolphin, Steno bredanensis DD
      - Genus: Tursiops
        - Common bottlenose dolphin, Tursiops truncatus LC
      - Genus: Globicephala
        - Short-finned pilot whale, Globicephala macrorhynchus DD
      - Genus: Grampus
        - Risso's dolphin, Grampus griseus DD
      - Genus: Peponocephala
        - Melon-headed whale, Peponocephala electra DD

== Order: Carnivora (carnivorans) ==
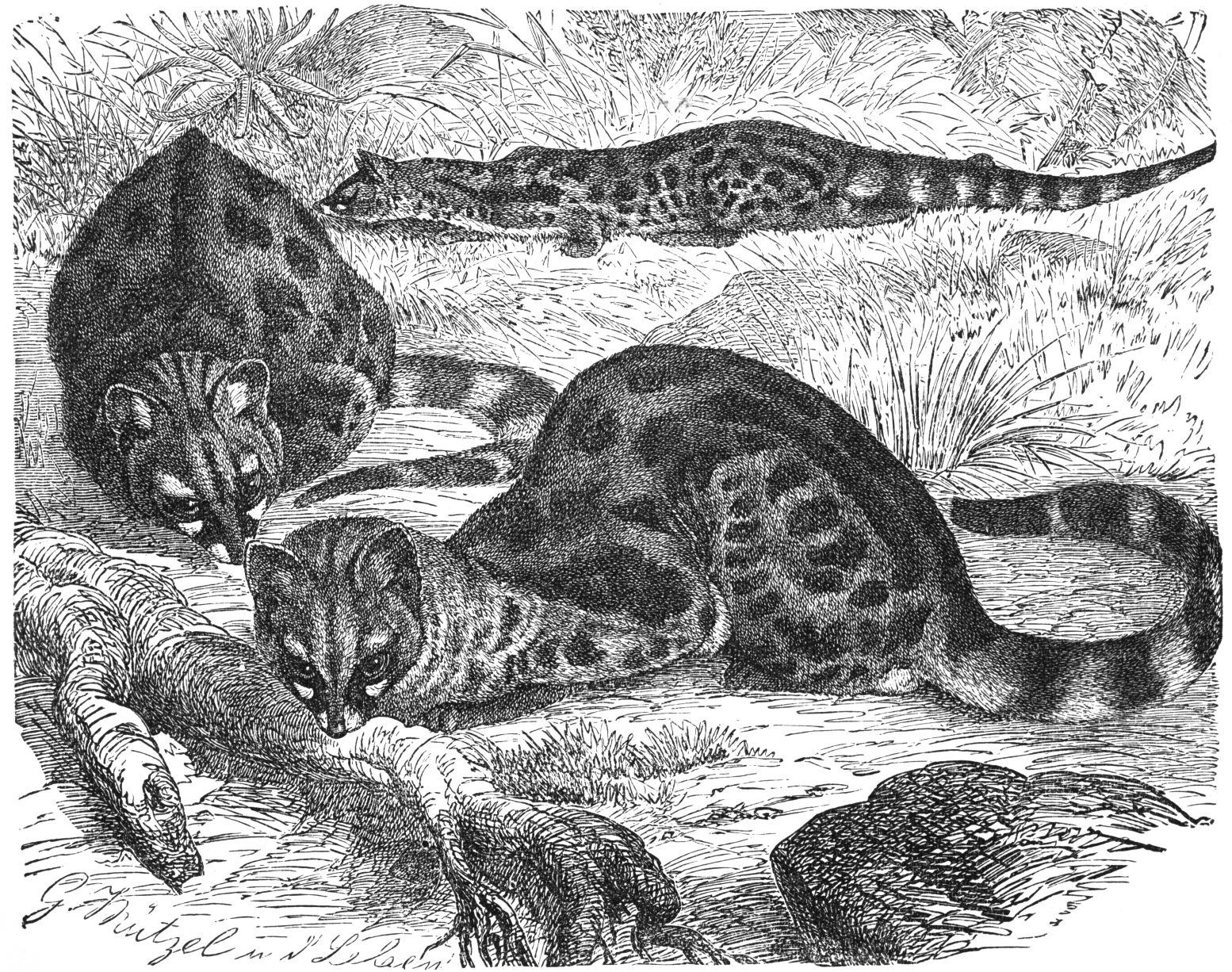
Common genet

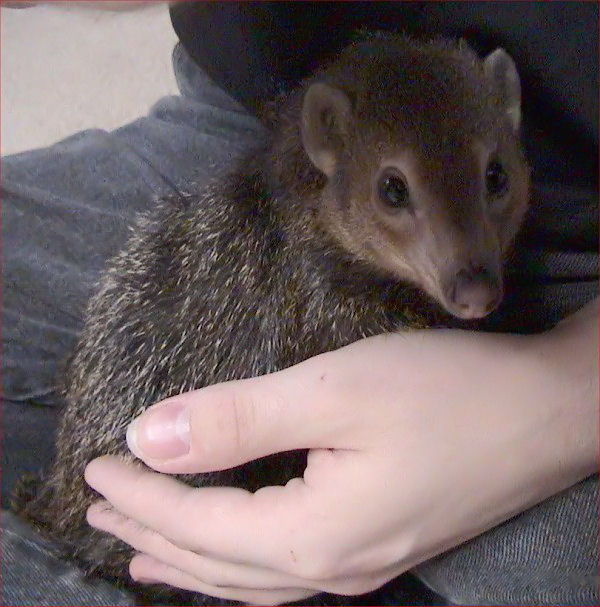
Common kusimanse

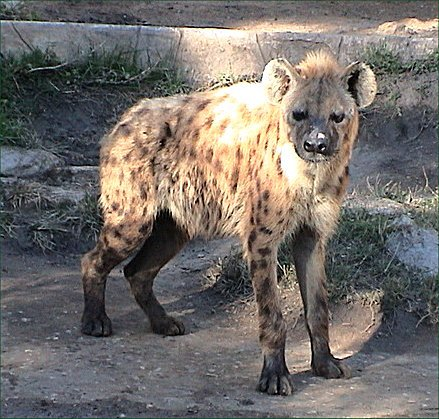
Spotted hyena

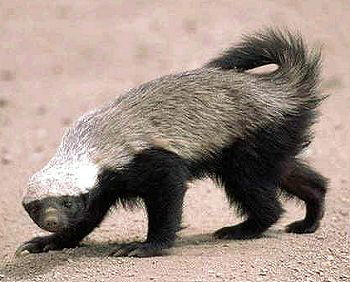
Honey badger

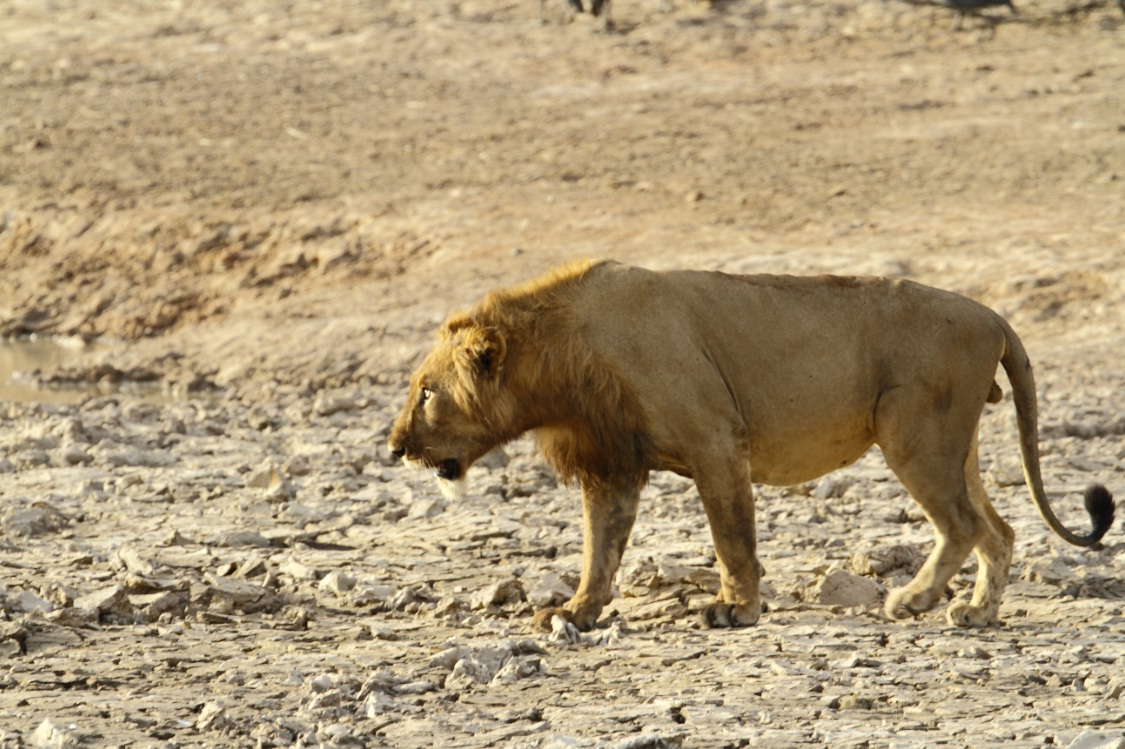
Lion

There are over 260 species of carnivorans, the majority of which feed primarily on meat. They have a characteristic skull shape and dentition.

- Suborder: Feliformia
  - Family: Felidae (cats)
    - Subfamily: Felinae
      - Genus: Caracal
        - African golden cat, C. aurata VU
        - Caracal, C. caracal LC
      - Genus: Leptailurus
        - Serval, L. serval LC
    - Subfamily: Pantherinae
      - Genus: Panthera
        - Lion, P. leo VU
        - Leopard, P. pardus VU
  - Family: Viverridae (civets, mongooses, etc.)
    - Subfamily: Viverrinae
      - Genus: Civettictis
        - African civet, C. civetta LC
      - Genus: Genetta
        - Common genet, G. genetta LC
        - Johnston's genet, Genetta johnstoni NT
        - Rusty-spotted genet, G. maculata LC
        - Pardine genet, Genetta pardina LC
        - King genet, Genetta poensis DD
        - Hausa genet, Genetta thierryi LC
  - Family: Nandiniidae
    - Genus: Nandinia
      - African palm civet, N. binotata LC
  - Family: Herpestidae (mongooses)
    - Genus: Atilax
      - Marsh mongoose, Atilax paludinosus
    - Genus: Crossarchus
      - Common kusimanse, Crossarchus obscurus LC
    - Genus: Herpestes
      - Egyptian mongoose, H. ichneumon LC
      - Common slender mongoose, H. sanguineus LC
    - Genus: Ichneumia
      - White-tailed mongoose, I. albacauda LC
    - Genus: Mungos
      - Gambian mongoose, M. gambianus LC
  - Family: Hyaenidae (hyaenas)
    - Genus: Crocuta
      - Spotted hyena, C. crocuta LC
    - Genus: Hyaena
      - Striped hyena, H. hyaena LC
- Suborder: Caniformia
  - Family: Canidae (dogs, foxes)
    - Genus: Lupulella
      - Side-striped jackal, L. adusta LC
    - Genus: Lycaon
      - African wild dog, L. pictus EN extirpated
  - Family: Mustelidae (mustelids)
    - Genus: Ictonyx
      - Striped polecat, Ictonyx striatus LC
    - Genus: Mellivora
      - Honey badger, M. capensis LC
    - Genus: Lutra
      - Speckle-throated otter, H. maculicollis NT possibly extirpated
    - Genus: Aonyx
      - African clawless otter, Aonyx capensis LC

== Order: Artiodactyla (even-toed ungulates) ==
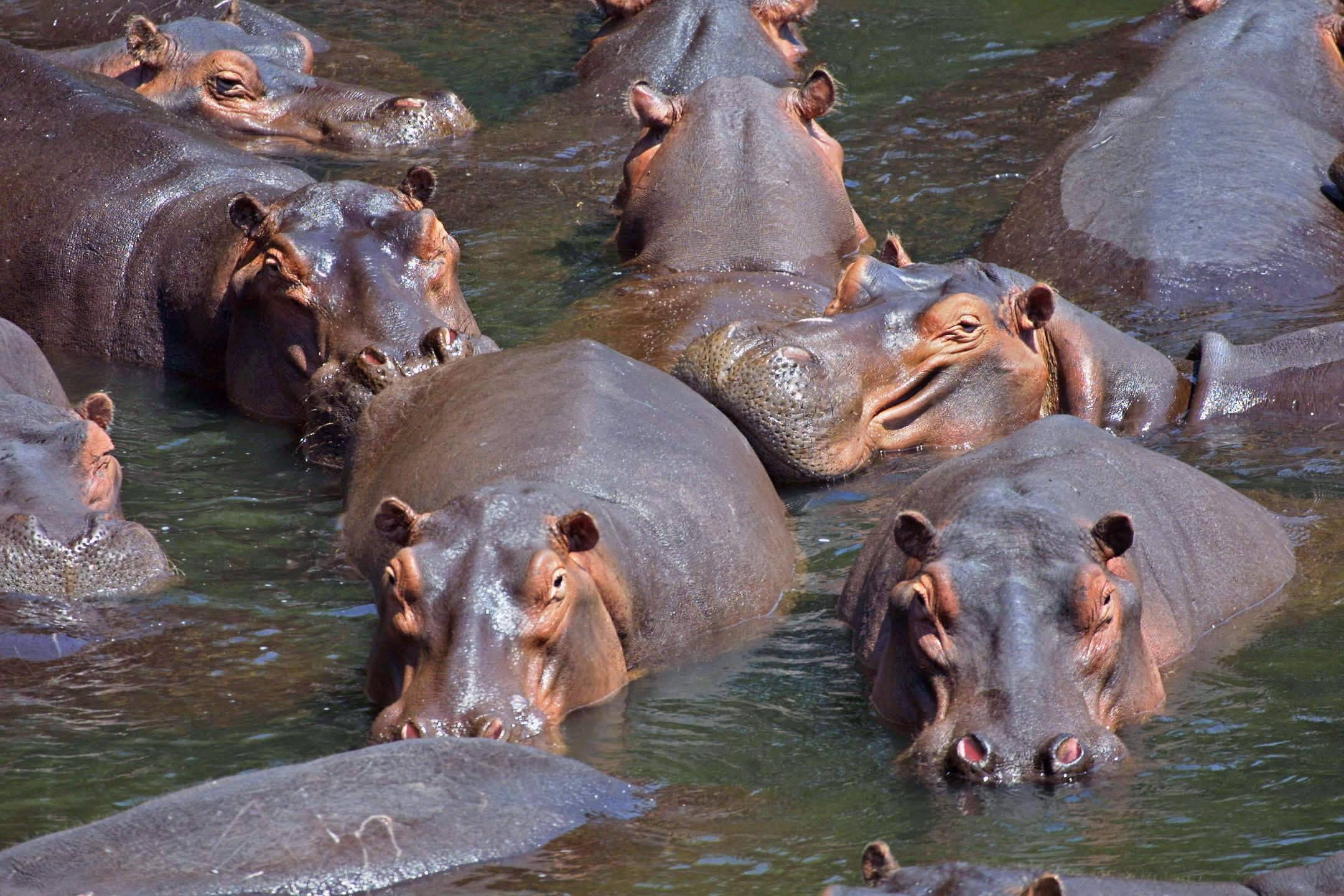
Hippopotamus

]

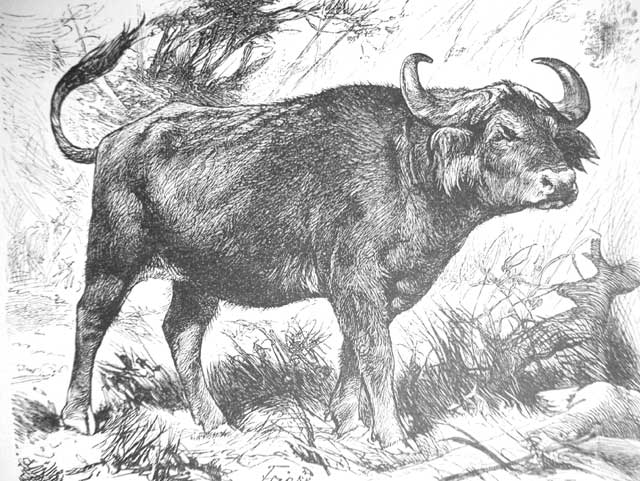
African buffalo

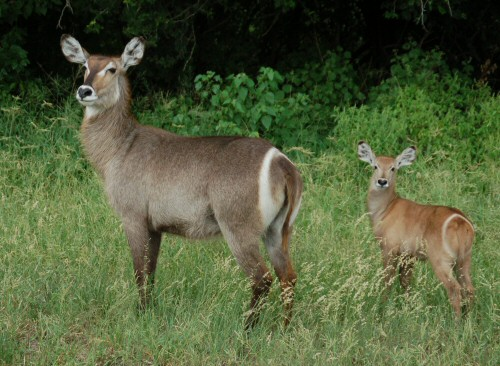
Waterbuck

The even-toed ungulates are ungulates whose weight is borne about equally by the third and fourth toes, rather than mostly or entirely by the third as in perissodactyls. There are about 220 artiodactyl species, including many that are of great economic importance to humans.

- Family: Suidae (pigs)
  - Subfamily: Phacochoerinae
    - Genus: Phacochoerus
      - Common warthog, Phacochoerus africanus LR/lc
  - Subfamily: Suinae
    - Genus: Hylochoerus
      - Giant forest hog, Hylochoerus meinertzhageni LR/lc
    - Genus: Potamochoerus
      - Red river hog, Potamochoerus porcus LR/lc
- Family: Hippopotamidae (hippopotamuses)
  - Genus: Hippopotamus
    - Hippopotamus, Hippopotamus amphibius VU
- Family: Tragulidae
  - Genus: Hyemoschus
    - Water chevrotain, Hyemoschus aquaticus DD
- Family: Bovidae (cattle, antelope, sheep, goats)
  - Subfamily: Alcelaphinae
    - Genus: Alcelaphus
      - Hartebeest, Alcelaphus buselaphus LR/cd
    - Genus: Damaliscus
      - Topi, Damaliscus lunatus LR/cd
  - Subfamily: Antilopinae
    - Genus: Eudorcas
      - Red-fronted gazelle, Eudorcas rufifrons VU extirpated
    - Genus: Neotragus
      - Royal antelope, Neotragus pygmaeus LR/nt
    - Genus: Ourebia
      - Oribi, Ourebia ourebi LR/cd
  - Subfamily: Bovinae
    - Genus: Syncerus
      - African buffalo, Syncerus caffer LR/cd
    - Genus: Tragelaphus
      - Giant eland, Tragelaphus derbianus LR/nt extirpated
      - Bongo, Tragelaphus eurycerus LR/nt
      - Bushbuck, Tragelaphus scriptus LR/lc
      - Sitatunga, Tragelaphus spekii LR/nt
  - Subfamily: Cephalophinae
    - Genus: Cephalophus
      - Bay duiker, Cephalophus dorsalis LR/nt
      - Maxwell's duiker, Philantomba maxwellii LR/nt
      - Black duiker, Cephalophus niger LR/nt
      - Ogilby's duiker, Cephalophus ogilbyi LR/nt
      - Red-flanked duiker, Cephalophus rufilatus LR/cd
      - Yellow-backed duiker, Cephalophus silvicultor LR/nt
    - Genus: Sylvicapra
      - Common duiker, Sylvicapra grimmia LR/lc
  - Subfamily: Hippotraginae
    - Genus: Hippotragus
      - Roan antelope, Hippotragus equinus LR/cd
  - Subfamily: Reduncinae
    - Genus: Kobus
      - Waterbuck, Kobus ellipsiprymnus LR/cd
      - Kob, Kobus kob LR/cd
    - Genus: Redunca
      - Bohor reedbuck, Redunca redunca LR/cd

== See also ==
- List of chordate orders
- Lists of mammals by region
- Mammal classification
- List of mammals described in the 2000s
