= List of mammals of Liberia =

This is a list of the mammal species recorded in Liberia. Of the mammal species in Liberia, nine are endangered, twelve are vulnerable, and eleven are near threatened.

The following tags are used to highlight each species' conservation status as assessed by the International Union for Conservation of Nature:

EX	Extinct	No reasonable doubt that the last individual has died.
EW	Extinct in the wild	Known only to survive in captivity or as a naturalized populations well outside its previous range.
CR	Critically endangered	The species is in imminent risk of extinction in the wild.
EN	Endangered	The species is facing an extremely high risk of extinction in the wild.
VU	Vulnerable	The species is facing a high risk of extinction in the wild.
NT	Near threatened	The species does not meet any of the criteria that would categorise it as risking extinction but it is likely to do so in the future.
LC	Least concern	There are no current identifiable risks to the species.
DD	Data deficient	There is inadequate information to make an assessment of the risks to this species.

== Order: Afrosoricida (tenrecs and golden moles) ==
The order Afrosoricida contains the golden moles of southern Africa and the tenrecs of Madagascar and Africa, two families of small mammals that were traditionally part of the order Insectivora.

- Family: Tenrecidae (tenrecs)
  - Subfamily: Potamogalinae
    - Genus: Micropotamogale
      - Nimba otter shrew, Micropotamogale lamottei NT

== Order: Hyracoidea (hyraxes) ==
The hyraxes are any of four species of fairly small, thickset, herbivorous mammals in the order Hyracoidea. About the size of a domestic cat they are well-furred, with rounded bodies and a stumpy tail. They are native to Africa and the Middle East.

- Family: Procaviidae (hyraxes)
  - Genus: Dendrohyrax
    - Western tree hyrax, Dendrohyrax dorsalis LC

== Order: Proboscidea (elephants) ==
The elephants comprise three living species and are the largest living land animals.

- Family: Elephantidae (elephants)
  - Genus: Loxodonta
    - African forest elephant, L. cyclotis CR

== Order: Sirenia (manatees and dugongs) ==
Sirenia is an order of fully aquatic, herbivorous mammals that inhabit rivers, estuaries, coastal marine waters, swamps, and marine wetlands. All four species are endangered.

- Family: Trichechidae
  - Genus: Trichechus
    - African manatee, Trichechus senegalensis VU

== Order: Primates ==
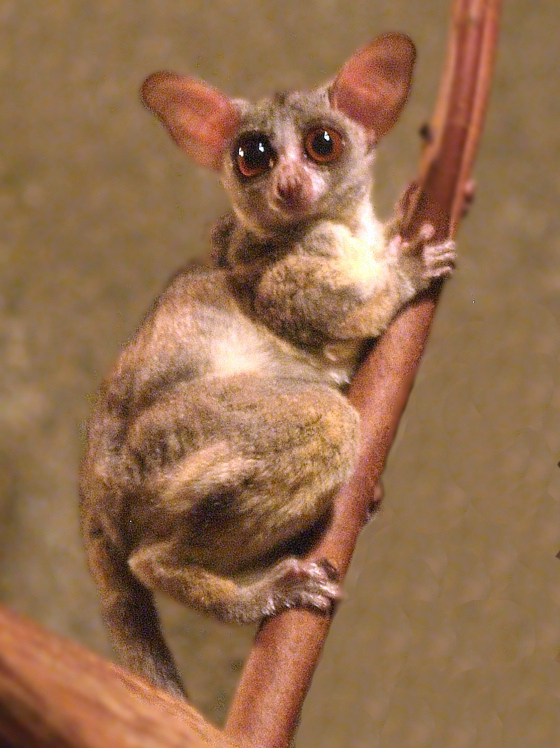
Senegal bushbaby

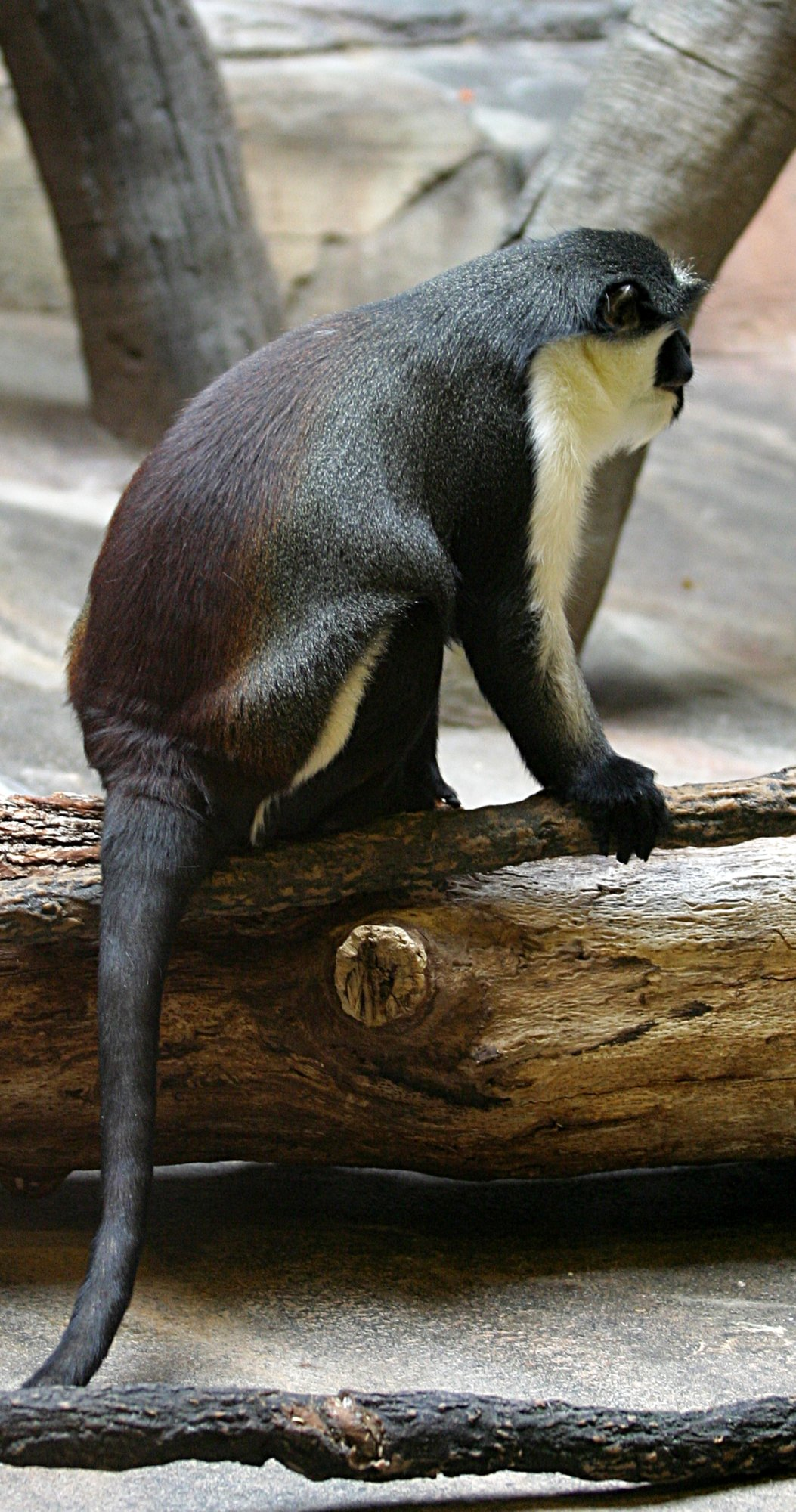
Diana monkey

The order Primates contains humans and their closest relatives: lemurs, lorisoids, tarsiers, monkeys, and apes.

- Suborder: Strepsirrhini
  - Infraorder: Lemuriformes
    - Superfamily: Lorisoidea
      - Family: Lorisidae (lorises, bushbabies)
        - Genus: Perodicticus
          - Potto, Perodicticus potto LC
      - Family: Galagidae
        - Genus: Galagoides
          - Prince Demidoff's bushbaby, Galago demidovii LC
        - Genus: Galago
          - Senegal bushbaby, Galago senegalensis LC
- Suborder: Haplorhini
  - Infraorder: Simiiformes
    - Parvorder: Catarrhini
      - Superfamily: Cercopithecoidea
        - Family: Cercopithecidae (Old World monkeys)
          - Genus: Chlorocebus
            - Green monkey, Chlorocebus sabaeus LC
          - Genus: Cercopithecus
            - Campbell's mona monkey, Cercopithecus campbelli LC
            - Diana monkey, Cercopithecus diana VU
            - Greater spot-nosed monkey, Cercopithecus nictitans LC
            - Lesser spot-nosed monkey, Cercopithecus petaurista LC
          - Genus: Cercocebus
            - Sooty mangabey, Cercocebus atys NT
          - Subfamily: Colobinae
            - Genus: Colobus
              - King colobus, Colobus polykomos VU
            - Genus: Procolobus
              - Western red colobus, Procolobus badius EN
              - Olive colobus, Procolobus verus NT
      - Superfamily: Hominoidea
        - Family: Hominidae (great apes)
          - Subfamily: Homininae
            - Tribe: Panini
              - Genus: Pan
                - Common chimpanzee, Pan troglodytes CR

== Order: Rodentia (rodents) ==
Rodents make up the largest order of mammals, with over 40% of mammalian species. They have two incisors in the upper and lower jaw which grow continually and must be kept short by gnawing. Most rodents are small though the capybara can weigh up to 45 kg (99 lb).

- Suborder: Hystricognathi
  - Family: Hystricidae (Old World porcupines)
    - Genus: Atherurus
      - African brush-tailed porcupine, Atherurus africanus LC
    - Genus: Hystrix
      - Crested porcupine, Hystrix cristata LC
  - Family: Thryonomyidae (cane rats)
    - Genus: Thryonomys
      - Greater cane rat, Thryonomys swinderianus LC
- Suborder: Sciurognathi
  - Family: Anomaluridae
    - Subfamily: Anomalurinae
      - Genus: Anomalurus
        - Lord Derby's scaly-tailed squirrel, Anomalurus derbianus LC
        - Pel's scaly-tailed squirrel, Anomalurus pelii DD
      - Genus: Anomalurops
        - Beecroft's scaly-tailed squirrel, Anomalurops beecrofti LC
    - Subfamily: Zenkerellinae
      - Genus: Idiurus
        - Long-eared flying mouse, Idiurus macrotis LC
  - Family: Sciuridae (squirrels)
    - Subfamily: Xerinae
      - Tribe: Protoxerini
        - Genus: Epixerus
          - Western palm squirrel, Epixerus ebii LC
        - Genus: Funisciurus
          - Fire-footed rope squirrel, Funisciurus pyrropus LC
        - Genus: Heliosciurus
          - Gambian sun squirrel, Heliosciurus gambianus LC
          - Small sun squirrel, Heliosciurus punctatus DD
          - Red-legged sun squirrel, Heliosciurus rufobrachium LC
        - Genus: Paraxerus
          - Green bush squirrel, Paraxerus poensis LC
        - Genus: Protoxerus
          - Slender-tailed squirrel, Protoxerus aubinnii DD
          - Forest giant squirrel, Protoxerus stangeri LC
  - Family: Gliridae (dormice)
    - Subfamily: Graphiurinae
      - Genus: Graphiurus
        - Jentink's dormouse, Graphiurus crassicaudatus DD
        - Lorrain dormouse, Graphiurus lorraineus LC
        - Nagtglas's African dormouse, Graphiurus nagtglasii LC
  - Family: Nesomyidae
    - Subfamily: Dendromurinae
      - Genus: Dendromus
        - Gray climbing mouse, Dendromus melanotis LC
    - Subfamily: Cricetomyinae
      - Genus: Cricetomys
        - Emin's pouched rat, Cricetomys emini LC
  - Family: Muridae (mice, rats, voles, gerbils, hamsters, etc.)
    - Subfamily: Deomyinae
      - Genus: Lophuromys
        - Rusty-bellied brush-furred rat, Lophuromys sikapusi LC
      - Genus: Uranomys
        - Rudd's mouse, Uranomys ruddi LC
    - Subfamily: Murinae
      - Genus: Colomys
        - African wading rat, Colomys goslingi LC
      - Genus: Dasymys
        - West African shaggy rat, Dasymys rufulus LC
      - Genus: Dephomys
        - Defua rat, Dephomys defua LC
        - Ivory Coast rat, Dephomys eburnea LC
      - Genus: Grammomys
        - Bunting's thicket rat, Grammomys buntingi DD
        - Shining thicket rat, Grammomys rutilans LC
      - Genus: Hybomys
        - Miller's striped mouse, Hybomys planifrons LC
        - Temminck's striped mouse, Hybomys trivirgatus LC
      - Genus: Hylomyscus
        - Allen's wood mouse, Hylomyscus alleni LC
      - Genus: Lemniscomys
        - Typical striped grass mouse, Lemniscomys striatus LC
      - Genus: Malacomys
        - Edward's swamp rat, Malacomys edwardsi LC
      - Genus: Mastomys
        - Guinea multimammate mouse, Mastomys erythroleucus LC
      - Genus: Mus
        - Peters's mouse, Mus setulosus LC
      - Genus: Oenomys
        - Ghana rufous-nosed rat, Oenomys ornatus LC
      - Genus: Praomys
        - Dalton's mouse, Praomys daltoni LC
        - Forest soft-furred mouse, Praomys rostratus LC
        - Tullberg's soft-furred mouse, Praomys tullbergi LC

== Order: Soricomorpha (shrews, moles, and solenodons) ==
The "shrew-forms" are insectivorous mammals. The shrews and solenodons closely resemble mice while the moles are stout-bodied burrowers.

- Family: Soricidae (shrews)
  - Subfamily: Crocidurinae
    - Genus: Crocidura
      - Buettikofer's shrew, Crocidura buettikoferi NT
      - Crosse's shrew, Crocidura crossei LC
      - Doucet's musk shrew, Crocidura douceti LC
      - Large-headed shrew, Crocidura grandiceps NT
      - Lamotte's shrew, Crocidura lamottei LC
      - West African long-tailed shrew, Crocidura muricauda LC
      - Nimba shrew, Crocidura nimbae NT
      - African giant shrew, Crocidura olivieri LC
      - Fraser's musk shrew, Crocidura poensis LC
      - Therese's shrew, Crocidura theresae LC
    - Genus: Sylvisorex
      - Climbing shrew, Sylvisorex megalura LC

== Order: Chiroptera (bats) ==
The bats' most distinguishing feature is that their forelimbs are developed as wings, making them the only mammals capable of flight. Bat species account for about 20% of all mammals.

- Family: Pteropodidae (flying foxes, Old World fruit bats)
  - Subfamily: Pteropodinae
    - Genus: Eidolon
      - Straw-coloured fruit bat, Eidolon helvum NT
    - Genus: Epomophorus
      - Gambian epauletted fruit bat, Epomophorus gambianus LC
    - Genus: Epomops
      - Buettikofer's epauletted fruit bat, Epomops buettikoferi LC
    - Genus: Hypsignathus
      - Hammer-headed bat, Hypsignathus monstrosus LC
    - Genus: Lissonycteris
      - Smith's fruit bat, Lissonycteris smithi LC
    - Genus: Micropteropus
      - Peters's dwarf epauletted fruit bat, Micropteropus pusillus LC
    - Genus: Myonycteris
      - Little collared fruit bat, Myonycteris torquata LC
    - Genus: Nanonycteris
      - Veldkamp's dwarf epauletted fruit bat, Nanonycteris veldkampi LC
    - Genus: Rousettus
      - Egyptian fruit bat, Rousettus aegyptiacus LC
    - Genus: Scotonycteris
      - Pohle's fruit bat, Scotonycteris ophiodon NT
      - Zenker's fruit bat, Scotonycteris zenkeri LC
  - Subfamily: Macroglossinae
    - Genus: Megaloglossus
      - Woermann's bat, Megaloglossus woermanni LC
- Family: Vespertilionidae
  - Subfamily: Kerivoulinae
    - Genus: Kerivoula
      - Lesser woolly bat, Kerivoula lanosa LC
      - Spurrell's woolly bat, Kerivoula phalaena LC
  - Subfamily: Myotinae
    - Genus: Myotis
      - Rufous mouse-eared bat, Myotis bocagii LC
      - Cape hairy bat, Myotis tricolor LC
  - Subfamily: Vespertilioninae
    - Genus: Glauconycteris
      - Abo bat, Glauconycteris poensis LC
    - Genus: Mimetillus
      - Moloney's mimic bat, Mimetillus moloneyi LC
    - Genus: Neoromicia
      - Dark-brown serotine, Neoromicia brunneus NT
      - Cape serotine, Neoromicia capensis LC
      - Banana pipistrelle, Neoromicia nanus LC
      - Somali serotine, Neoromicia somalicus LC
      - White-winged serotine, Neoromicia tenuipinnis LC
    - Genus: Pipistrellus
      - Tiny pipistrelle, Pipistrellus nanulus LC
    - Genus: Scotophilus
      - African yellow bat, Scotophilus dinganii LC
      - Nut-colored yellow bat, Scotophilus nux LC
  - Subfamily: Miniopterinae
    - Genus: Miniopterus
      - Greater long-fingered bat, Miniopterus inflatus LC
      - Common bent-wing bat, Miniopterus schreibersii NT
- Family: Molossidae
  - Genus: Chaerephon
    - Gland-tailed free-tailed bat, Chaerephon bemmeleni LC
    - Lappet-eared free-tailed bat, Chaerephon major LC
  - Genus: Mops
    - Sierra Leone free-tailed bat, Mops brachypterus LC
    - Spurrell's free-tailed bat, Mops spurrelli LC
    - Railer bat, Mops thersites LC
- Family: Emballonuridae
  - Genus: Saccolaimus
    - Pel's pouched bat, Saccolaimus peli LC
- Family: Nycteridae
  - Genus: Nycteris
    - Bate's slit-faced bat, Nycteris arge LC
    - Large slit-faced bat, Nycteris grandis LC
    - Hairy slit-faced bat, Nycteris hispida LC
    - Large-eared slit-faced bat, Nycteris macrotis LC
    - Ja slit-faced bat, Nycteris major DD
- Family: Rhinolophidae
  - Subfamily: Rhinolophinae
    - Genus: Rhinolophus
      - Halcyon horseshoe bat, Rhinolophus alcyone DD
      - Rüppell's horseshoe bat, Rhinolophus fumigatus DD
      - Guinean horseshoe bat, Rhinolophus guineensis VU
      - Hill's horseshoe bat, Rhinolophus hillorum NT
      - Lander's horseshoe bat, Rhinolophus landeri LC
      - Bushveld horseshoe bat, Rhinolophus simulator LC
      - Ziama horseshoe bat, Rhinolophus ziama EN
  - Subfamily: Hipposiderinae
    - Genus: Hipposideros
      - Benito roundleaf bat, Hipposideros beatus LC
      - Cyclops roundleaf bat, Hipposideros cyclops LC
      - Sooty roundleaf bat, Hipposideros fuliginosus LC
      - Jones's roundleaf bat, Hipposideros jonesi NT
      - Aellen's roundleaf bat, Hipposideros marisae VU
      - Noack's roundleaf bat, Hipposideros ruber LC

== Order: Pholidota (pangolins) ==
The order Pholidota comprises the eight species of pangolin. Pangolins are anteaters and have the powerful claws, elongated snout and long tongue seen in the other unrelated anteater species.

- Family: Manidae
  - Genus: Manis
    - Giant pangolin, Manis gigantea VU
    - Long-tailed pangolin, Manis tetradactyla VU
    - Tree pangolin, Manis tricuspis VU

== Order: Cetacea (whales) ==
The order Cetacea includes whales, dolphins and porpoises. They are the mammals most fully adapted to aquatic life with a spindle-shaped nearly hairless body, protected by a thick layer of blubber, and forelimbs and tail modified to provide propulsion underwater.

- Suborder: Mysticeti
  - Family: Balaenopteridae
    - Subfamily: Balaenopterinae
      - Genus: Balaenoptera
        - Common minke whale, Balaenoptera acutorostrata LC
        - Sei whale, Balaenoptera borealis EN
        - Bryde's whale, Balaenoptera brydei DD
        - Blue whale, Balaenoptera musculus EN
        - Fin whale, Balaenoptera physalus EN
    - Subfamily: Megapterinae
      - Genus: Megaptera
        - Humpback whale, Megaptera novaeangliae LC
- Suborder: Odontoceti
  - Superfamily: Platanistoidea
    - Family: Phocoenidae
      - Genus: Phocoena
        - Harbour porpoise, Phocoena phocoena LC
    - Family: Physeteridae
      - Genus: Physeter
        - Sperm whale, Physeter macrocephalus VU
    - Family: Kogiidae
      - Genus: Kogia
        - Pygmy sperm whale, Kogia breviceps DD
        - Dwarf sperm whale, Kogia sima DD
    - Family: Ziphidae
      - Genus: Mesoplodon
        - Blainville's beaked whale, Mesoplodon densirostris DD
        - Gervais' beaked whale, Mesoplodon europaeus DD
      - Genus: Ziphius
        - Cuvier's beaked whale, Ziphius cavirostris LC
    - Family: Delphinidae (marine dolphins)
      - Genus: Orcinus
        - Killer whale, Orcinus orca DD
      - Genus: Feresa
        - Pygmy killer whale, Feresa attenuata DD
      - Genus: Pseudorca
        - False killer whale, Pseudorca crassidens DD
      - Genus: Delphinus
        - Short-beaked common dolphin, Delphinus delphis LC
      - Genus: Lagenodelphis
        - Fraser's dolphin, Lagenodelphis hosei LC
      - Genus: Stenella
        - Pantropical spotted dolphin, Stenella attenuata LC
        - Clymene dolphin, Stenella clymene DD
        - Striped dolphin, Stenella coeruleoalba LC
        - Atlantic spotted dolphin, Stenella frontalis LC
        - Spinner dolphin, Stenella longirostris DD
      - Genus: Steno
        - Rough-toothed dolphin, Steno bredanensis LC
      - Genus: Tursiops
        - Common bottlenose dolphin, Tursiops truncatus LC
      - Genus: Globicephala
        - Short-finned pilot whale, Globicephala macrorhynchus DD
      - Genus: Grampus
        - Risso's dolphin, Grampus griseus LC
      - Genus: Peponocephala
        - Melon-headed whale, Peponocephala electra LC

== Order: Carnivora (carnivorans) ==
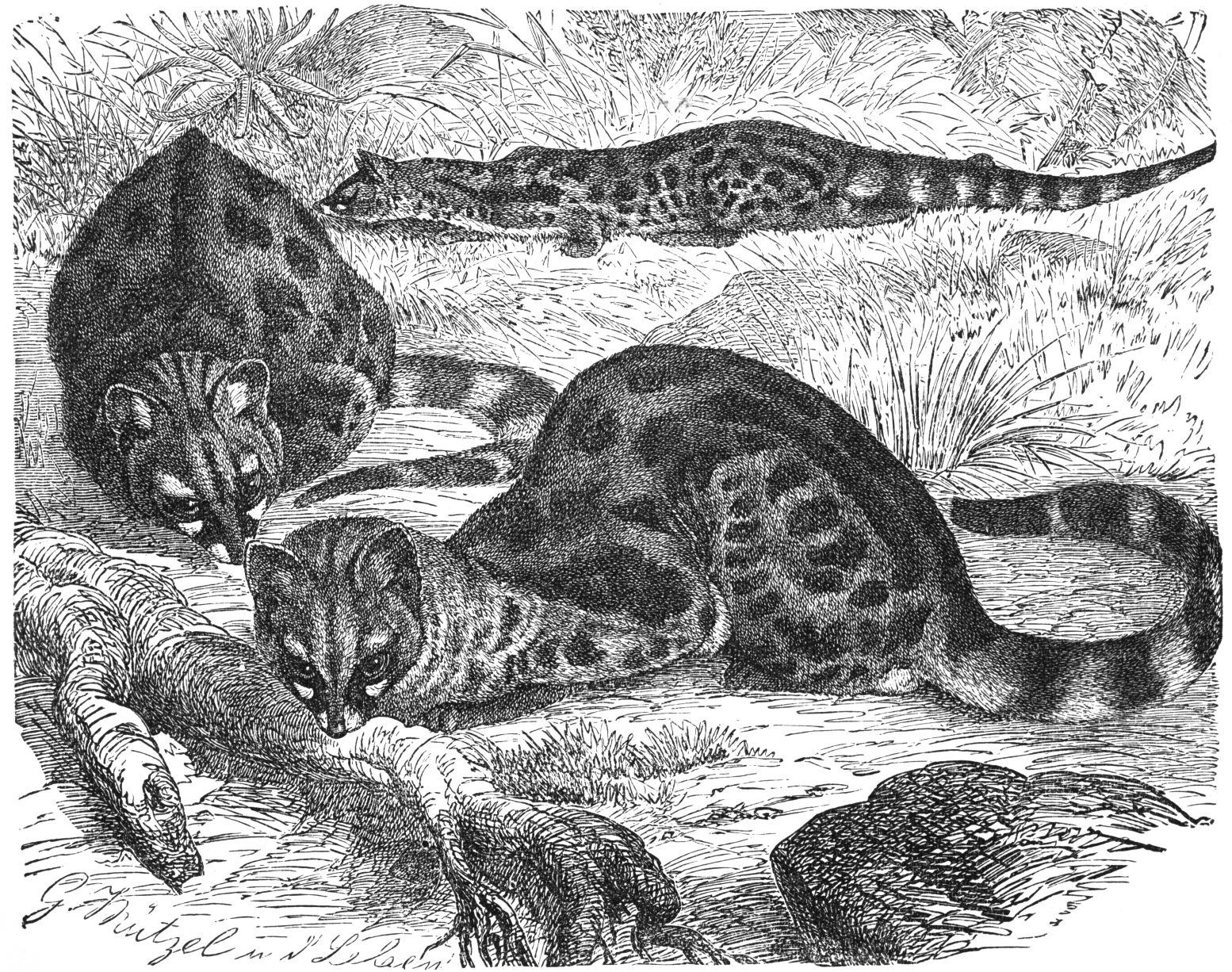
Common genet

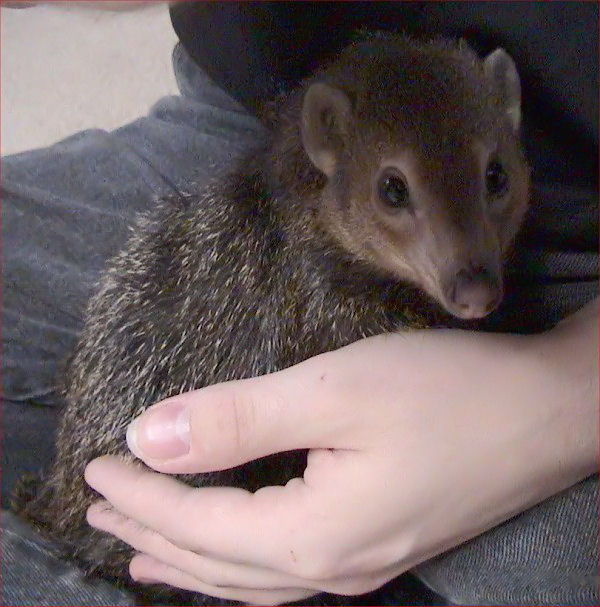
Common kusimanse

There are over 260 species of carnivorans, the majority of which feed primarily on meat. They have a characteristic skull shape and dentition.

- Suborder: Feliformia
  - Family: Felidae (cats)
    - Subfamily: Felinae
      - Genus: Leptailurus
        - Serval, L. serval LC
      - Genus: Caracal
        - African golden cat, C. aurata VU
    - Subfamily: Pantherinae
      - Genus: Panthera
        - Leopard, P. pardus VU
  - Family: Viverridae (civets, mongooses, etc.)
    - Subfamily: Viverrinae
      - Genus: Civettictis
        - African civet, Civettictis civetta LC
      - Genus: Genetta
        - Johnston's genet, Genetta johnstoni NT
      - Genus: Poiana
        - Leighton's linsang, Poiana leightoni VU
  - Family: Nandiniidae
    - Genus: Nandinia
      - African palm civet, Nandinia binotata LC
  - Family: Herpestidae (mongooses)
    - Genus: Atilax
      - Marsh mongoose, Atilax paludinosus LC
    - Genus: Crossarchus
      - Common kusimanse, Crossarchus obscurus LC
    - Genus: Herpestes
      - Egyptian mongoose, Herpestes ichneumon LC
      - Common slender mongoose, Herpestes sanguineus LC
    - Genus: Liberiictis
      - Liberian mongoose, Liberiictis kuhni VU
- Suborder: Caniformia
  - Family: Mustelidae (mustelids)
    - Genus: Mellivora
      - Honey badger, Mellivora capensis LC
    - Genus: Hydrictis
      - Speckle-throated otter, H. maculicollis NT
    - Genus: Aonyx
      - African clawless otter, Aonyx capensis NT

== Order: Artiodactyla (even-toed ungulates) ==
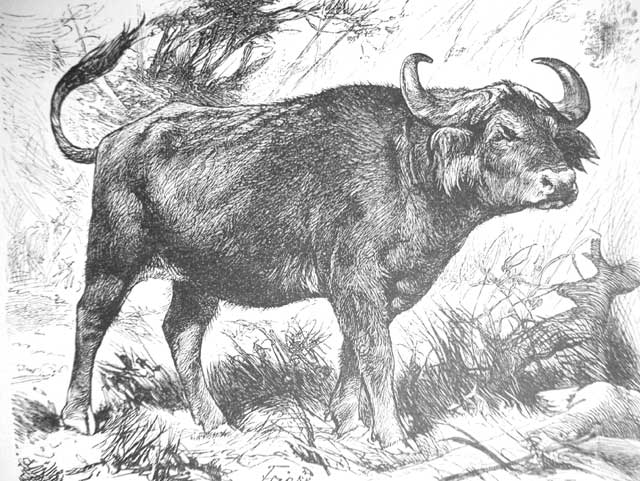
African buffalo

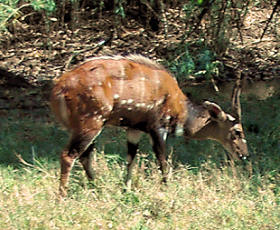
Bushbuck

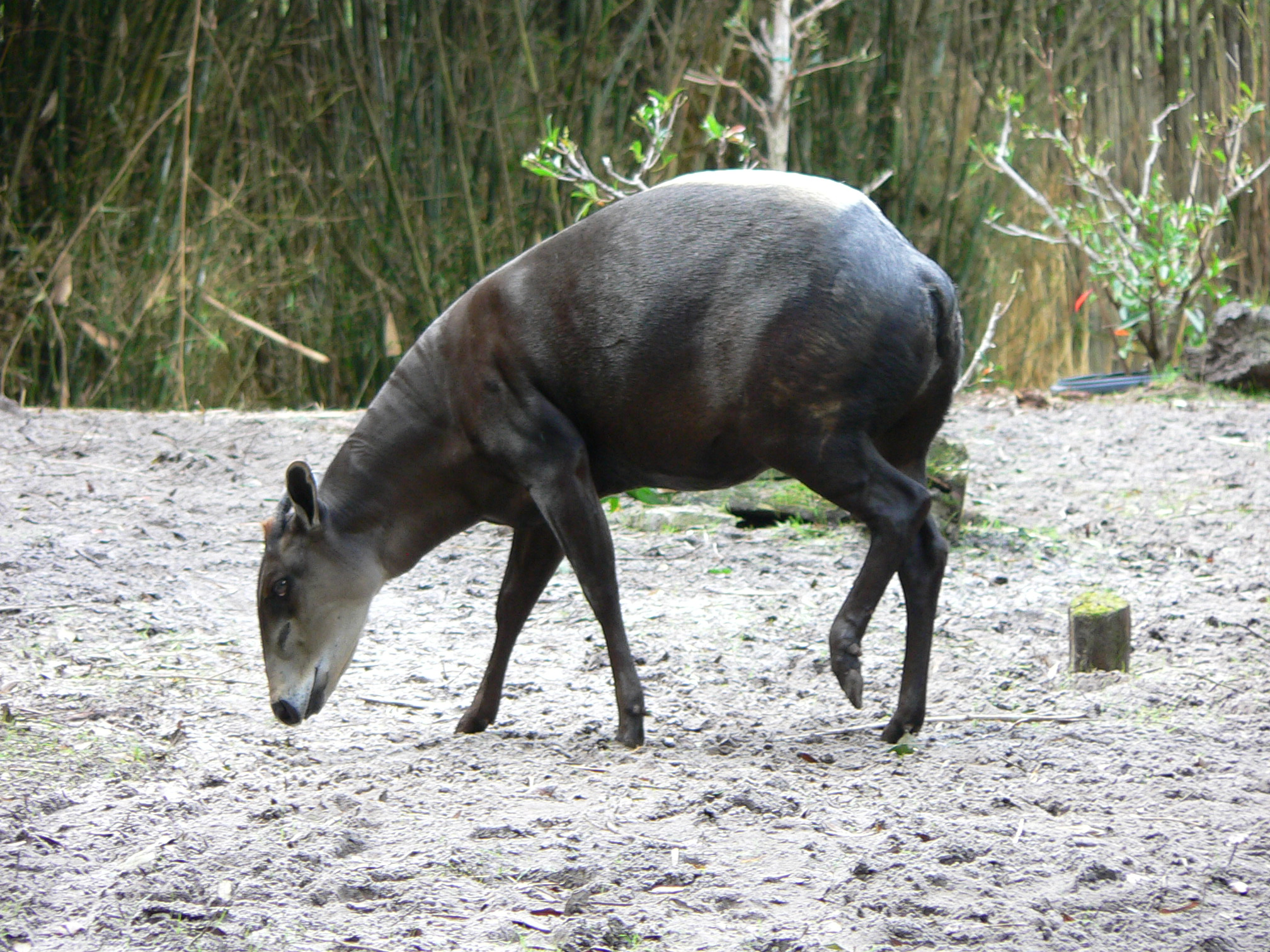
Yellow-backed duiker

The even-toed ungulates are ungulates whose weight is borne about equally by the third and fourth toes, rather than mostly or entirely by the third as in perissodactyls. There are about 220 artiodactyl species, including many that are of great economic importance to humans.

- Family: Suidae (pigs)
  - Subfamily: Phacochoerinae
    - Genus: Phacochoerus
      - Common warthog, Phacochoerus africanus LC
  - Subfamily: Suinae
    - Genus: Hylochoerus
      - Giant forest hog, Hylochoerus meinertzhageni LC
    - Genus: Potamochoerus
      - Red river hog, Potamochoerus porcus LC
- Family: Hippopotamidae (hippopotamuses)
  - Genus: Choeropsis
    - Pygmy hippopotamus, Choeropsis liberiensis EN
  - Genus: Hippopotamus
    - Hippopotamus, Hippopotamus amphibius VU extirpated
- Family: Tragulidae
  - Genus: Hyemoschus
    - Water chevrotain, Hyemoschus aquaticus LC
- Family: Bovidae (cattle, antelope, sheep, goats)
  - Subfamily: Antilopinae
    - Genus: Neotragus
      - Royal antelope, Neotragus pygmaeus LC
  - Subfamily: Bovinae
    - Genus: Syncerus
      - African buffalo, Syncerus caffer LC
    - Genus: Tragelaphus
      - Bongo, Tragelaphus eurycerus NT
      - Bushbuck, Tragelaphus scriptus LC
  - Subfamily: Cephalophinae
    - Genus: Cephalophus
      - Bay duiker, Cephalophus dorsalis NT
      - Jentink's duiker, Cephalophus jentinki EN
      - Maxwell's duiker, Cephalophus maxwellii LC
      - Black duiker, Cephalophus niger LC
      - Ogilby's duiker, Cephalophus ogilbyi VU
      - Yellow-backed duiker, Cephalophus silvicultor NT
      - Zebra duiker, Cephalophus zebra VU

== See also ==
- Wildlife of Liberia
