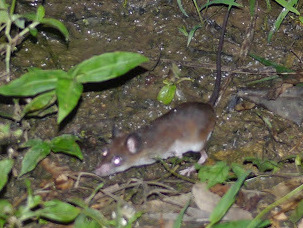

Conservation status
- Least Concern (IUCN 3.1)

Scientific classification
- Kingdom: Animalia
- Phylum: Chordata
- Class: Mammalia
- Infraclass: Placentalia
- Order: Rodentia
- Family: Muridae
- Genus: Malacomys
- Species: M. longipes

Binomial name
- Malacomys longipes Milne-Edwards, 1877

= Big-eared swamp rat =

Species of rodent

The big-eared swamp rat (Malacomys longipes) is a species of rodent in the family Muridae. It is found in sub-Saharan Africa from Nigeria to Kenya and south to Zambia and Angola. Its natural habitat is subtropical or tropical moist lowland forests.
