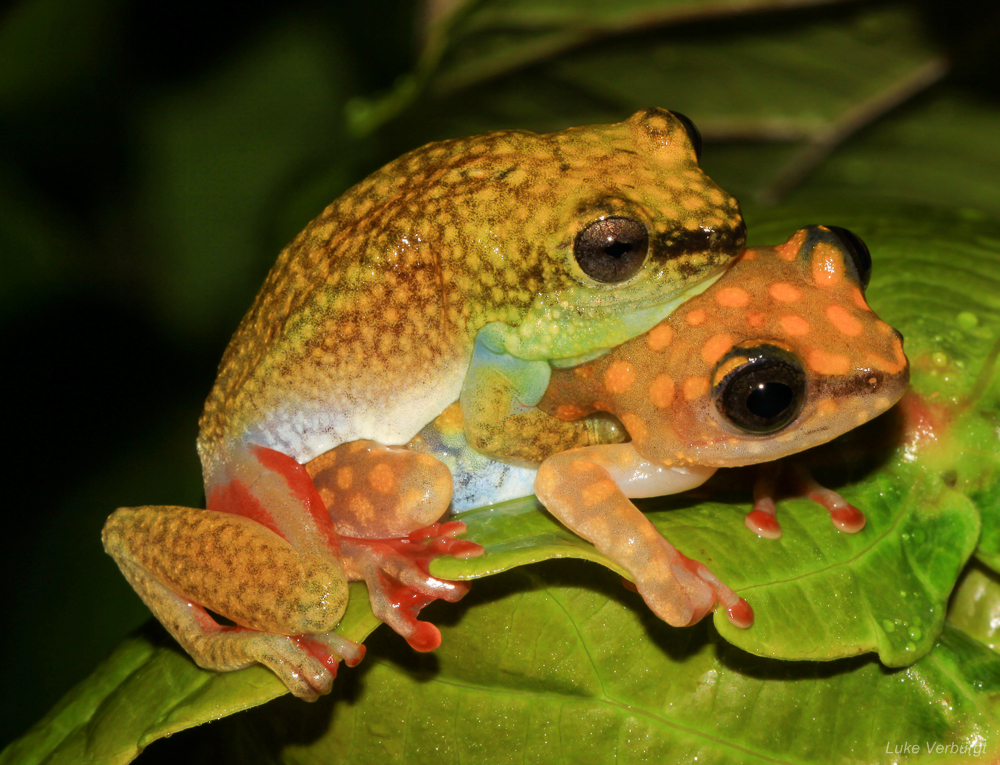

Conservation status
- Least Concern (IUCN 3.1)

Scientific classification
- Kingdom: Animalia
- Phylum: Chordata
- Class: Amphibia
- Order: Anura
- Family: Hyperoliidae
- Genus: Hyperolius
- Species: H. guttulatus

Binomial name
- Hyperolius guttulatus Günther, 1858

Synonyms
- Hyperolius reticulatus Günther, 1865 "1864"; Rappia lagoensis Günther, 1869 "1868"; Hyperolius lagoensis (Günther, 1869); Hyperolius buchholzi Ahl, 1931; Hyperolius liberiensis Laurent, 1951

= Hyperolius guttulatus =

Species of frog

Hyperolius guttulatus is a species of frog in the family Hyperoliidae. It occurs in West and Middle Africa between Sierra Leone in the west and Gabon in the east/south. Common name dotted reed frog has been coined for this species.

== Distribution ==
The species is found, from west to east, in Sierra Leone, Guinea, Liberia, Ivory Coast, Ghana, Togo, Nigeria, Cameroon, and western Gabon. It probably occurs in mainland Equatorial Guinea, whereas the gap in Benin might be real.

== Description ==
Hyperolius guttulatus is a relatively large member of its genus, with males measuring 27–35 mm (1.1–1.4 in) and females 29–37 mm (1.1–1.5 in) in snout–vent length. The body is broad and flat and there is a conspicuous dark canthal stripe. The pupil is horizontal. Males have a large gular flap. There are two colour phases:

- All juveniles and many mature males display phase "J". In this phase, the dorsum is dull bluish to yellowish green; ventral surfaces are greenish yellow. There is a light stripe above the dark canthal stripe. There might also be some diffuse, dark spots, and the dorsolateral line might be bordered with black.
- All females, and some males, develop into phase "F" prior to the first breeding season. The dorsum is dark brown to reddish and has round or oblong orange spots; the ventrum is greyish white. There is variation within this phase; sometimes the light spots are large, sometimes they are very small and numerous. In some Cameroonian specimens the dorsum is uniform brown to reddish and there are black dots on the sides and ventrum.

Male advertisement call is a rapid succession of pure, low-pitched notes that have a soft tonal quality.

== Habitat and conservation ==
Hyperolius guttulatus lives in and around large swamps in secondary habitats in the forest belt; in West Africa it typically occurs in the forest-savanna transition forest. It is not found in undisturbed forest. Breeding takes place very large, mostly permanent ponds. Males call from bushes several metres above the ground.

The distribution of this species is very patchy, but it can be locally very abundant. It is threatened by habitat loss, especially when affecting its breeding sites. It occurs in a number of protected areas, including the Ankasa Conservation Area and Kakum National Park in Ghana.
