= Ivory Coast rat =

Conservation status
- Least Concern (IUCN 3.1)

Scientific classification
- Kingdom: Animalia
- Phylum: Chordata
- Class: Mammalia
- Order: Rodentia
- Family: Muridae
- Genus: Dephomys
- Species: D. eburneae

Binomial name
- Dephomys eburneae (Heim de Balsac & Bellier, 1967)

Species of rodent

The Ivory Coast rat (Dephomys eburneae) is a species of rodent in the family Muridae. It is found in Ivory Coast, possibly Ghana, and Liberia. Its natural habitats are subtropical or tropical moist lowland forest and subtropical or tropical swampland.
