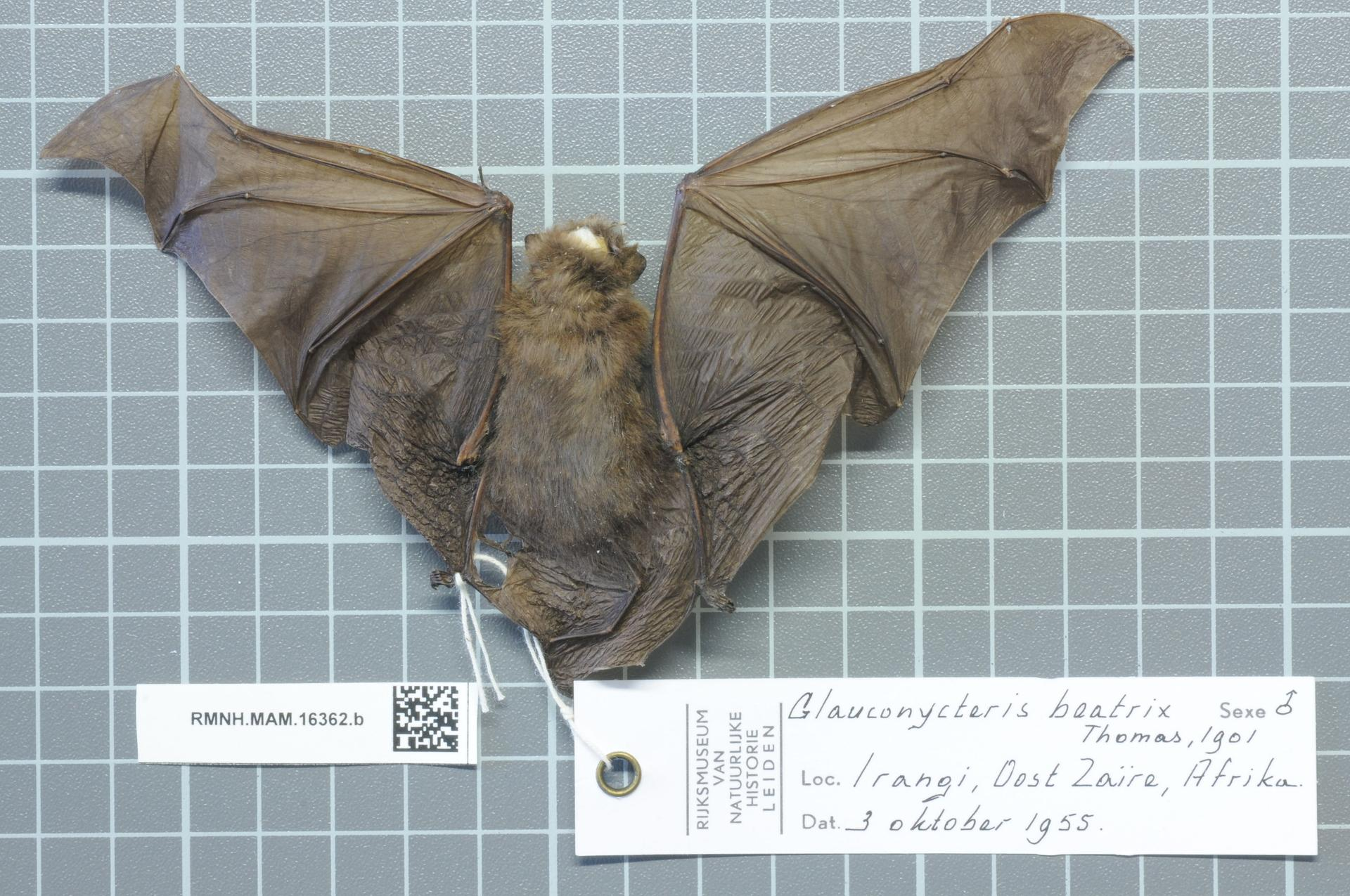

Conservation status
- Least Concern (IUCN 3.1)

Scientific classification
- Kingdom: Animalia
- Phylum: Chordata
- Class: Mammalia
- Order: Chiroptera
- Family: Vespertilionidae
- Genus: Glauconycteris
- Species: G. beatrix

Binomial name
- Glauconycteris beatrix Thomas, 1901

Synonyms
- Chalinolobus beatrix Thomas, 1901

= Beatrix's bat =

Species of bat

Beatrix's bat (Glauconycteris beatrix) is a species of vesper bat in the family Vespertilionidae. It can be found in Angola, Central African Republic, Democratic Republic of the Congo, Ivory Coast, Equatorial Guinea, Gabon, Ghana, Kenya, and Nigeria. It is found in subtropical or tropical moist lowland forests.

== Taxonomy and etymology ==
It was described as a new species in 1901 by British zoologist Oldfield Thomas. The holotype used to describe the species was collected by George Latimer Bates in 1898 along the Benito River in what was then the French Congo. While Thomas did not state who the eponym was for the species name "beatrix", it has been hypothesized that he named it after Princess Beatrice.

== Description ==
It is a small species of bat with blackish brown fur. Its flight membranes are uniformly brown. It has a broad snout and short, broad tragi. Its forearm length is approximately 39 mm (1.5 in).

== Range and habitat ==
Beatrix's bat is found in several countries in West and Central Africa, including Angola, Cameroon, Central African Republic, Congo, The Democratic Republic of the Congo, Ivory Coast, Equatorial Guinea, Gabon, Ghana, and Nigeria. It is associated with tropical lowland forests.

== Conservation ==
As of 2017, it is evaluated as a least-concern species by the IUCN.
