= Mouselike pipistrelle =

Conservation status
- Data Deficient (IUCN 3.1)

Scientific classification
- Kingdom: Animalia
- Phylum: Chordata
- Class: Mammalia
- Order: Chiroptera
- Family: Vespertilionidae
- Genus: Hypsugo
- Species: H. musciculus

Binomial name
- Hypsugo musciculus Thomas, 1913

Synonyms
- Pipistrellus musciculus Thomas, 1913; Afropipistrellus musciculus Thomas, 1913

Species of bat

The mouselike pipistrelle (Hypsugo musciculus) is a species of vesper bat in the family Vespertilionidae. It is found in Cameroon, Republic of the Congo, Democratic Republic of the Congo, and Gabon. Its natural habitats are subtropical and tropical dry and moist lowland forests.

It is the only species in the genus Hypsugo known to exist in sub-Saharan Africa; all others have been reclassified into the genera Neoromicia or Nycticeinops. However, its exact taxonomic placement remains uncertain.
