= Malacomys =

Scientific classification
- Kingdom: Animalia
- Phylum: Chordata
- Class: Mammalia
- Order: Rodentia
- Family: Muridae
- Subfamily: Murinae
- Tribe: Malacomyini; Lecompte et al., 2008
- Genus: Malacomys; Milne-Edwards, 1877

Type species
- Malacomys longipes

Species
- Malacomys cansdalei; Malacomys edwardsi; Malacomys longipes

Genus of rodents

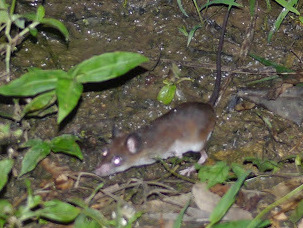
Malacomys longipes

Malacomys is a genus of rodents in the family Muridae native to Africa. It is the only member of the tribe Malacomyini.

It contains the following three species:

- Cansdale's swamp rat (Malacomys cansdalei) - Ansell, 1958
- Edward's swamp rat (Malacomys edwardsi) - Rochebrune, 1885
- Big-eared swamp rat (Malacomys longipes) - Milne-Edwards, 1877
