= Dephomys =

Scientific classification
- Domain: Eukaryota
- Kingdom: Animalia
- Phylum: Chordata
- Class: Mammalia
- Order: Rodentia
- Family: Muridae
- Subfamily: Murinae
- Tribe: Arvicanthini
- Genus: Dephomys; Thomas, 1926

Type species
- Mus defua

Species
- Dephomys defua Dephomys eburneae

Genus of rodents

Dephomys is a genus of rodent in the family Muridae endemic to Africa. It contains the following species:

- Defua rat (Dephomys defua)
- Ivory Coast rat (Dephomys eburneae)
