= Tiny pipistrelle =

Conservation status
- Least Concern (IUCN 3.1)

Scientific classification
- Kingdom: Animalia
- Phylum: Chordata
- Class: Mammalia
- Order: Chiroptera
- Family: Vespertilionidae
- Genus: Pipistrellus
- Species: P. nanulus

Binomial name
- Pipistrellus nanulus Thomas, 1904

Species of bat

The tiny pipistrelle (Pipistrellus nanulus) is a species of vesper bat. It can be found in Benin, Burkina Faso, Cameroon, Central African Republic, Democratic Republic of the Congo, Ivory Coast, Equatorial Guinea, Gabon, Ghana, Guinea, Kenya, Liberia, Nigeria, Senegal, Sierra Leone, and Uganda. It is found in subtropical or tropical dry forest, subtropical or tropical moist lowland forest, and moist savanna.
