= Defua rat =

Conservation status
- Least Concern (IUCN 3.1)

Scientific classification
- Kingdom: Animalia
- Phylum: Chordata
- Class: Mammalia
- Order: Rodentia
- Family: Muridae
- Genus: Dephomys
- Species: D. defua

Binomial name
- Dephomys defua (Miller, 1900)

Species of rodent

The Defua rat (Dephomys defua) is a species of rodent in the family Muridae. It is found in Ivory Coast, Ghana, Guinea, Liberia, and Sierra Leone. Its natural habitats are subtropical or tropical moist lowland forests, subtropical or tropical swamps, and subtropical or tropical moist montane forests.
