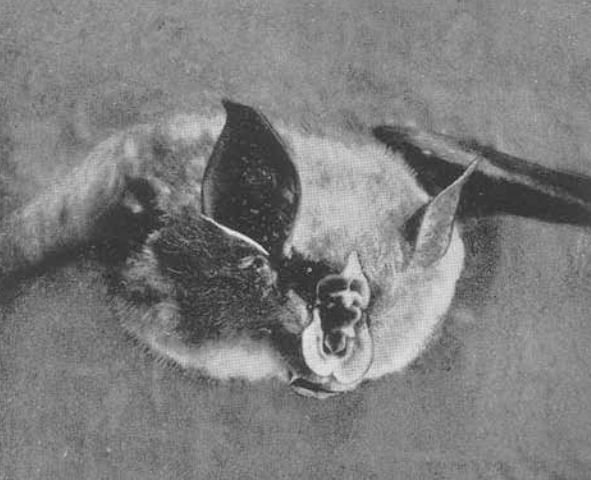

Conservation status
- Least Concern (IUCN 3.1)

Scientific classification
- Kingdom: Animalia
- Phylum: Chordata
- Class: Mammalia
- Order: Chiroptera
- Family: Rhinolophidae
- Genus: Rhinolophus
- Species: R. landeri

Binomial name
- Rhinolophus landeri Martin, 1837
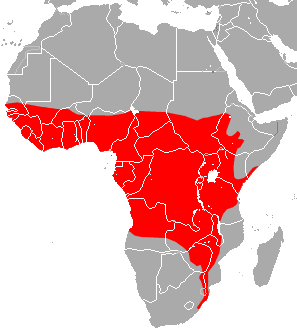
- Lander's horseshoe bat range

Synonyms
- Rhinolophus angolensis de Seabra, 1898; Rhinolophus dobsoni Thomas, 1904; Rhinolophus axillaris Allen, 1917

= Lander's horseshoe bat =

Species of bat

Lander's horseshoe bat (Rhinolophus landeri) is a species of bat in the family Rhinolophidae found in Africa. Its natural habitats are savanna and caves.

== Taxonomy and etymology ==
It was described as a new species in 1837 by English naturalist William Charles Linnaeus Martin. The eponym for the species name "landeri" was explorer Richard Lander. Martin named the species after Lander because the holotype had been collected during Lander's expedition to Fernando Pó. It was Martin's intention to posthumously honor Lander, calling him "enterprising, but unfortunate" after his untimely death at age 29.

== Description ==
It is a medium-sized member of its family. Individuals weigh 5–11 g (0.18–0.39 oz). Total length is approximately 75 mm (3.0 in); tail length is 23 mm (0.91 in) and forearm length is 38–41 mm (1.5–1.6 in).

== Range and habitat ==
It has been widely documented throughout Sub-Saharan Africa. Individuals have been found at relatively high elevations—up to 2,000 m (6,600 ft) above sea level on Kenya's Mount Elgon.

== Conservation ==
It is currently evaluated as least concern by the IUCN—its lowest conservation priority. It meets the criteria for this assessment because it has a wide geographic range; its population size is likely large; and it is unlikely that it is in rapid decline.
