= West African long-tailed shrew =

Conservation status
- Least Concern (IUCN 3.1)

Scientific classification
- Kingdom: Animalia
- Phylum: Chordata
- Class: Mammalia
- Order: Eulipotyphla
- Family: Soricidae
- Genus: Crocidura
- Species: C. muricauda

Binomial name
- Crocidura muricauda (Miller, 1900)
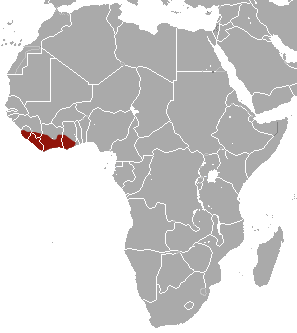
- West African long-tailed shrew range

Species of mammal

The West African long-tailed shrew (Crocidura muricauda) is a species of mammal in the family Soricidae. It can be found in Ivory Coast, Ghana, Guinea, Liberia, and Sierra Leone. Its natural habitat is subtropical or tropical moist lowland forests.
