= Nut-colored yellow bat =

Conservation status
- Least Concern (IUCN 3.1)

Scientific classification
- Kingdom: Animalia
- Phylum: Chordata
- Class: Mammalia
- Order: Chiroptera
- Family: Vespertilionidae
- Genus: Scotophilus
- Species: S. nux

Binomial name
- Scotophilus nux Thomas, 1904

Species of bat

The nut-colored yellow bat (Scotophilus nux) is a species of vesper bat. It can be found in Cameroon, Democratic Republic of the Congo, Ivory Coast, Equatorial Guinea, Ghana, Guinea, Kenya, Liberia, Nigeria, Rwanda, Sierra Leone, and Uganda. It is found in subtropical or tropical moist lowland forests.
