= Edward's swamp rat =

Conservation status
- Least Concern (IUCN 3.1)

Scientific classification
- Domain: Eukaryota
- Kingdom: Animalia
- Phylum: Chordata
- Class: Mammalia
- Order: Rodentia
- Family: Muridae
- Genus: Malacomys
- Species: M. edwardsi

Binomial name
- Malacomys edwardsi Rochebrune, 1885

Species of rodent

Edward's swamp rat (Malacomys edwardsi) is a species of rodent in the family Muridae. It is found in Ivory Coast, Ghana, Guinea, Liberia, Nigeria, and Sierra Leone. Its natural habitats are subtropical or tropical moist lowland forests and subtropical or tropical moist shrubland.
