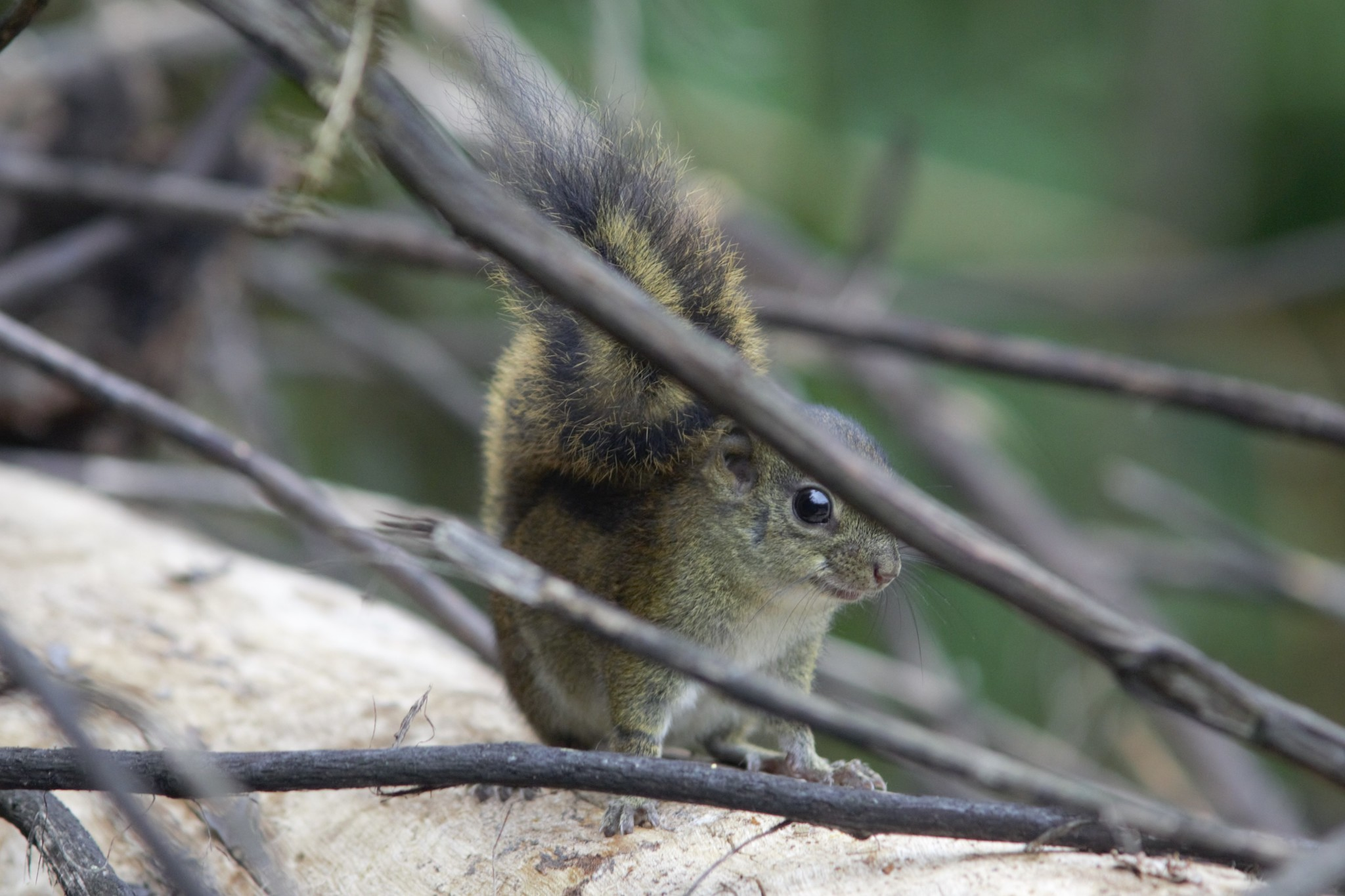
- Paraxerus poensis at Mount Cameroon

Conservation status
- Least Concern (IUCN 3.1)

Scientific classification
- Kingdom: Animalia
- Phylum: Chordata
- Class: Mammalia
- Order: Rodentia
- Family: Sciuridae
- Genus: Paraxerus
- Species: P. poensis

Binomial name
- Paraxerus poensis (A. Smith, 1830)

= Green bush squirrel =

Species of rodent

The green bush squirrel (Paraxerus poensis) is a species of rodent in the family Sciuridae. It is found in Benin, Cameroon, the Republic of the Congo, the Democratic Republic of the Congo, Ivory Coast, Equatorial Guinea, Gabon, Ghana, Guinea, Liberia, Nigeria, and Sierra Leone.

== Habitat ==
Its natural habitats are subtropical or tropical moist lowland forest and plantations.
