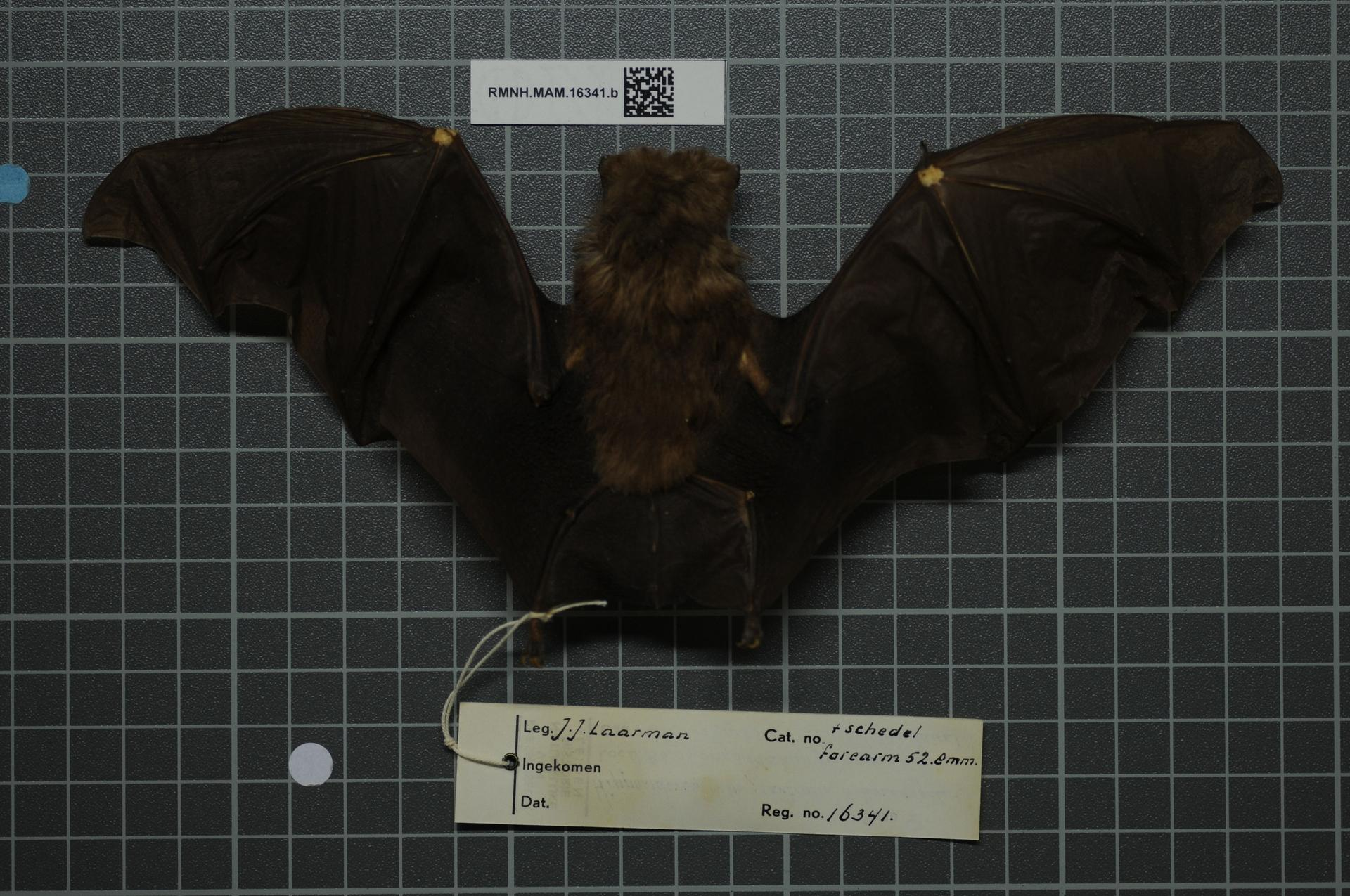

Conservation status
- Least Concern (IUCN 3.1)

Scientific classification
- Kingdom: Animalia
- Phylum: Chordata
- Class: Mammalia
- Order: Chiroptera
- Family: Hipposideridae
- Genus: Macronycteris
- Species: H. ruber

Binomial name
- Hipposideros ruber Noack, 1893
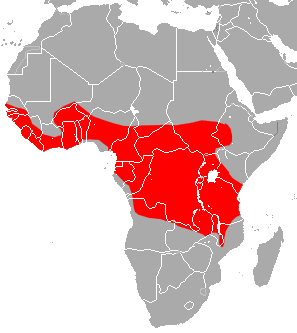
- Noack's roundleaf bat range

= Noack's roundleaf bat =

Species of bat

Noack's roundleaf bat (Hipposideros ruber) is a species of bat in the family Hipposideridae. It is found throughout tropical Africa. Its natural habitats are subtropical or tropical moist lowland forests, moist savanna, and caves and other subterranean habitats.

== Taxonomy ==
The bat is also known by the synonyms H. centralis and H. niapu.

== Description ==
Newly molted individuals of the species are gray in color, but eventually turn orange, lost probably due to the presence of ammonia in roosts.

== Biology ==
Some populations of the bat are partially diurnal, with daytime foraging, chases, and other activity observed in populations of H. ruber on the island of São Tomé.

=== Diet ===
The bat seems to hunt by detecting the fluttering of wings by moths to decide whether to attack. If a moth was not fluttering its wings, or stopped during an attack, the bat would terminate its approach. The bat also does not use sight or sound to detect fluttering of wings. This appears to be a way to reduce clutter while hunting.

=== Echolocation ===
The bat echolocates at a frequency of 132-138 kHz.

== Habitat and distribution ==
The bat's range extends throughout much of West, Central, and East Africa and part of southern Africa including Angola, southern Democratic Republic of the Congo, northern and eastern Zambia, southern Malawi and north-western Mozambique. The bat can be found up until 2300 meters above sea level.

The bat mainly inhabits lowland tropical moist forest but is also found in relic and riverine forests in dry savanna. The bat is known to roost in caves, rocky crevices and abandoned mineshafts. Animals have also been found under a bridge, in a hollow kapok tree and in derelict buildings.

== Conservation ==
The species is assessed as least-concern due to its large population, widespread range, and lack of considerable decline in population. The bat may be locally threatened in some areas due to habitat loss and subsistence hunting. The bat is not protected by any laws, but is known to exist in the Manga Forest Reserve of Tanzania.
