= Climbing shrew =

Conservation status
- Least Concern (IUCN 3.1)

Scientific classification
- Kingdom: Animalia
- Phylum: Chordata
- Class: Mammalia
- Order: Eulipotyphla
- Family: Soricidae
- Genus: Suncus
- Species: S. megalurus

Binomial name
- Suncus megalurus (Jentink, 1888)
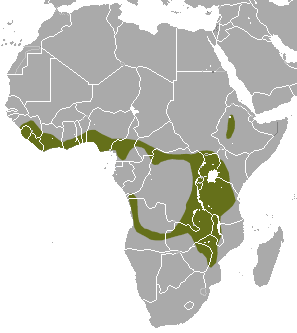
- Climbing shrew range

Synonyms
- Pachyura megalura Jentink, 1888; Suncus megalura (Jentink, 1888); Sylvisorex megalura (Jentink, 1888)

Species of mammal

The climbing shrew (Suncus megalurus) is a species of mammal in the family Soricidae, which is found in subtropical Africa. It is found in Angola, Benin, Burundi, Cameroon, Central African Republic, Republic of the Congo, Democratic Republic of the Congo, Ivory Coast, Ethiopia, Ghana, Guinea, Kenya, Liberia, Malawi, Mozambique, Nigeria, Rwanda, Sierra Leone, South Sudan, Tanzania, Togo, Uganda, Zambia, and Zimbabwe. Its natural habitats are subtropical or tropical moist lowland and montane forests, and moist savanna.
