= Crosse's shrew =

Conservation status
- Least Concern (IUCN 3.1)

Scientific classification
- Kingdom: Animalia
- Phylum: Chordata
- Class: Mammalia
- Order: Eulipotyphla
- Family: Soricidae
- Genus: Crocidura
- Species: C. crossei

Binomial name
- Crocidura crossei Thomas, 1895
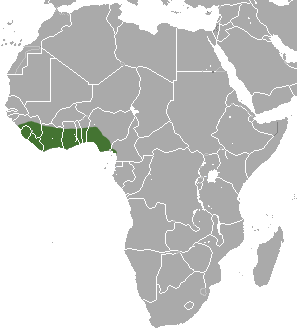
- Crosse's shrew range

Species of mammal

Crosse's shrew (Crocidura crossei) is a species of mammal in the family Soricidae. It is found in Benin, Cameroon, Ivory Coast, Ghana, Guinea, Liberia, Nigeria, Sierra Leone, and Togo. Its natural habitat is subtropical or tropical moist lowland forests.

== Literature ==
- Thomas O. (1895) Descriptions of five new African shrews. Annals and Magazine of Natural History series 6 (16): 51-55.
