= List of mammals of Cameroon =

This is a list of the mammal species recorded in Cameroon. There are 327 mammal species in Cameroon, of which four are critically endangered, sixteen are endangered, twenty-three are vulnerable, and fourteen are near threatened.

The following tags are used to highlight each species' conservation status as assessed by the International Union for Conservation of Nature:

| EX | Extinct | No reasonable doubt that the last individual has died. |
| EW | Extinct in the wild | Known only to survive in captivity or as a naturalized populations well outside its previous range. |
| CR | Critically endangered | The species is in imminent risk of extinction in the wild. |
| EN | Endangered | The species is facing an extremely high risk of extinction in the wild. |
| VU | Vulnerable | The species is facing a high risk of extinction in the wild. |
| NT | Near threatened | The species does not meet any of the criteria that would categorise it as risking extinction but it is likely to do so in the future. |
| LC | Least concern | There are no current identifiable risks to the species. |
| DD | Data deficient | There is inadequate information to make an assessment of the risks to this species. |

Some species were assessed using an earlier set of criteria. Species assessed using this system have the following instead of near threatened and least concern categories:

| LR/cd | Lower risk/conservation dependent | Species which were the focus of conservation programmes and may have moved into a higher risk category if that programme was discontinued. |
| LR/nt | Lower risk/near threatened | Species which are close to being classified as vulnerable but are not the subject of conservation programmes. |
| LR/lc | Lower risk/least concern | Species for which there are no identifiable risks. |

== Order: Afrosoricida (tenrecs and golden moles) ==
The order Afrosoricida contains the golden moles of southern Africa and the tenrecs of Madagascar and Africa, two families of small mammals that were traditionally part of the order Insectivora.

- Family: Tenrecidae (tenrecs)
  - Subfamily: Potamogalinae
    - Genus: Potamogale
      - Giant otter shrew, P. velox LC
- Family: Chrysochloridae
  - Subfamily: Chrysochlorinae
    - Genus: Chrysochloris
      - Stuhlmann's golden mole, Chrysochloris stuhlmanni LC
  - Subfamily: Amblysominae
    - Genus: Calcochloris
      - Congo golden mole, Calcochloris leucorhinus DD

== Order: Tubulidentata (aardvarks) ==
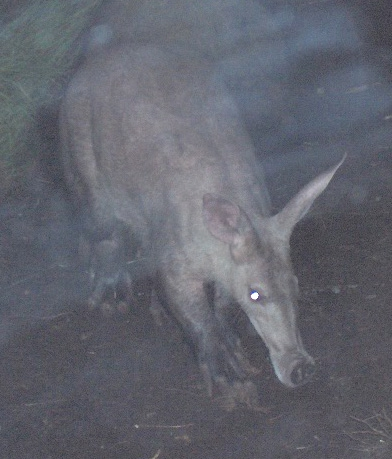
Aardvark

The order Tubulidentata consists of a single species, the aardvark. Tubulidentata are characterised by their teeth which lack a pulp cavity and form thin tubes which are continuously worn down and replaced.

- Family: Orycteropodidae
  - Genus: Orycteropus
    - Aardvark, O. afer LC

== Order: Hyracoidea (hyraxes) ==
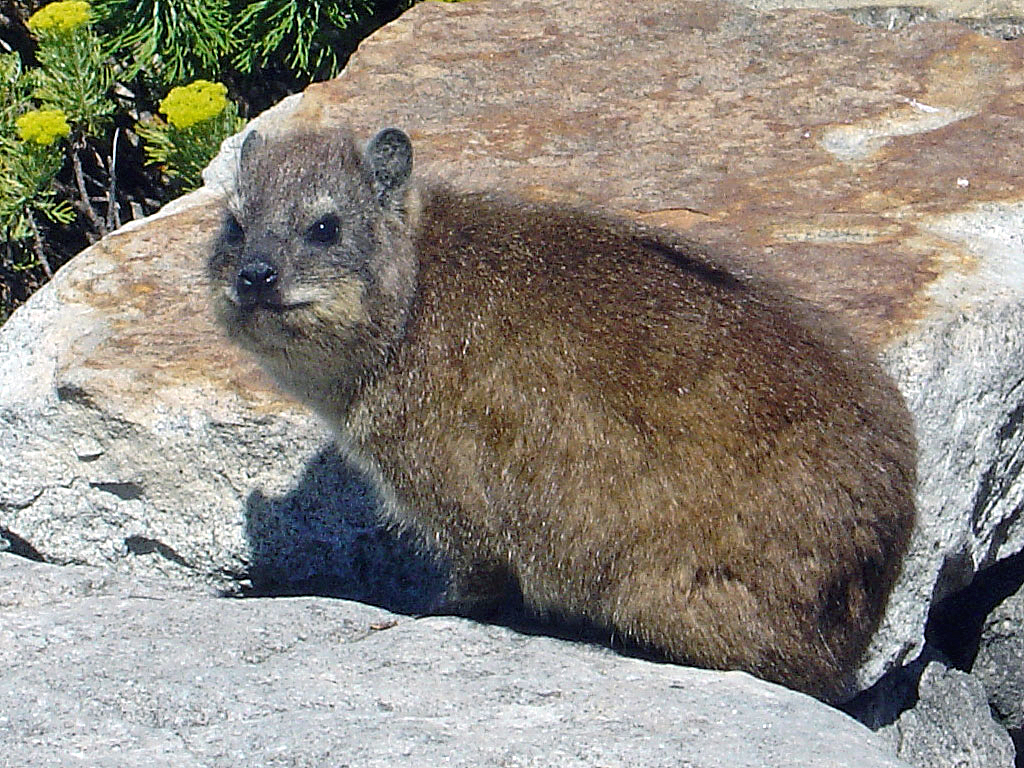
Cape hyrax

The hyraxes are any of four species of fairly small, thickset, herbivorous mammals in the order Hyracoidea. About the size of a domestic cat they are well-furred, with rounded bodies and a stumpy tail. They are native to Africa and the Middle East.

- Family: Procaviidae (hyraxes)
  - Genus: Dendrohyrax
    - Western tree hyrax, D. dorsalis LC
  - Genus: Procavia
    - Cape hyrax, P. capensis LC

== Order: Proboscidea (elephants) ==
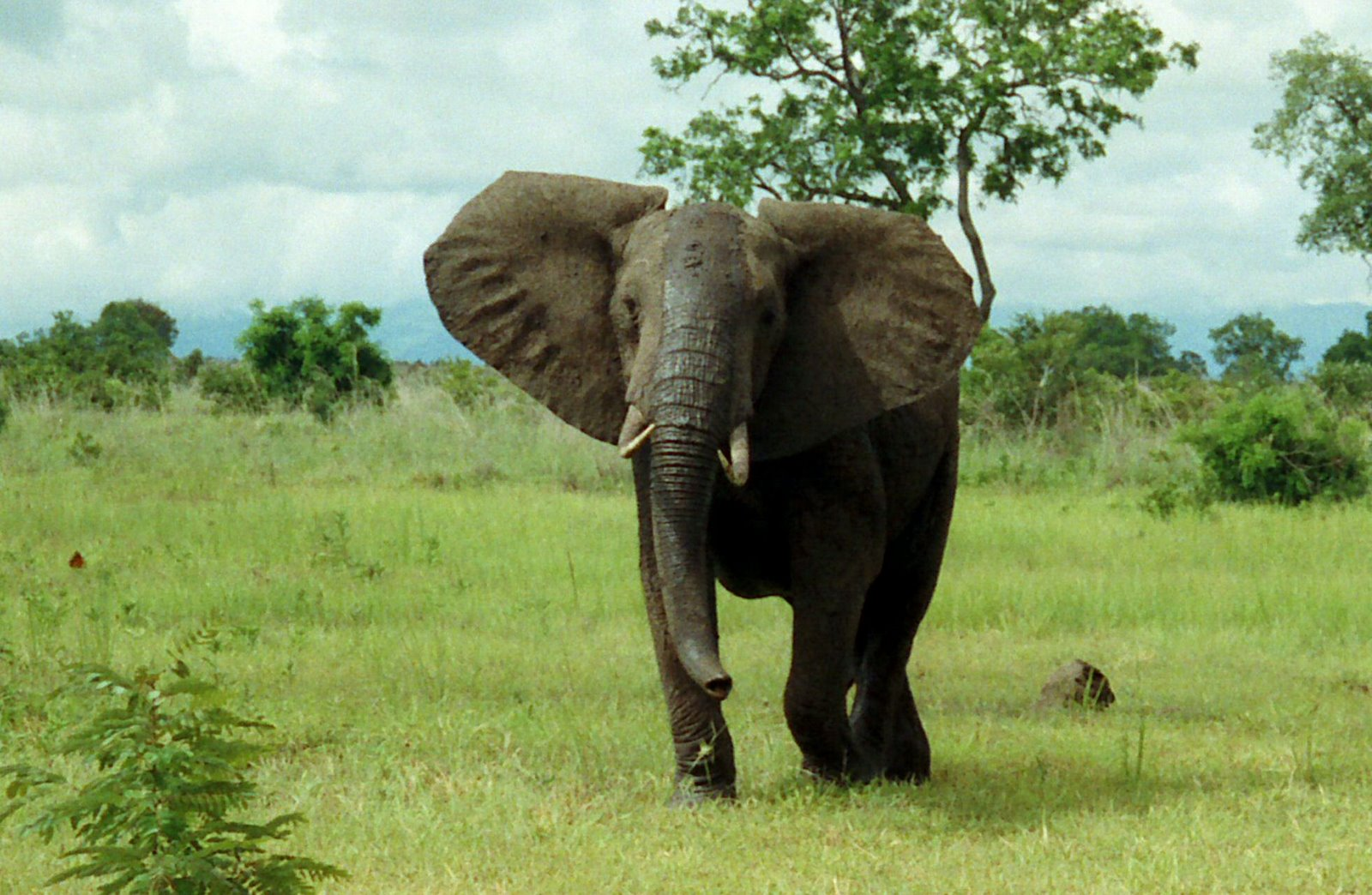
African bush elephant

The elephants comprise three living species and are the largest living land animals.

- Family: Elephantidae (elephants)
  - Genus: Loxodonta
    - African bush elephant, L. africana EN
    - African forest elephant, L. cyclotis CR

== Order: Sirenia (manatees and dugongs) ==
Sirenia is an order of fully aquatic, herbivorous mammals that inhabit rivers, estuaries, coastal marine waters, swamps, and marine wetlands. All four species are endangered.

- Family: Trichechidae
  - Genus: Trichechus
    - African manatee, Trichechus senegalensis VU

== Order: Primates ==
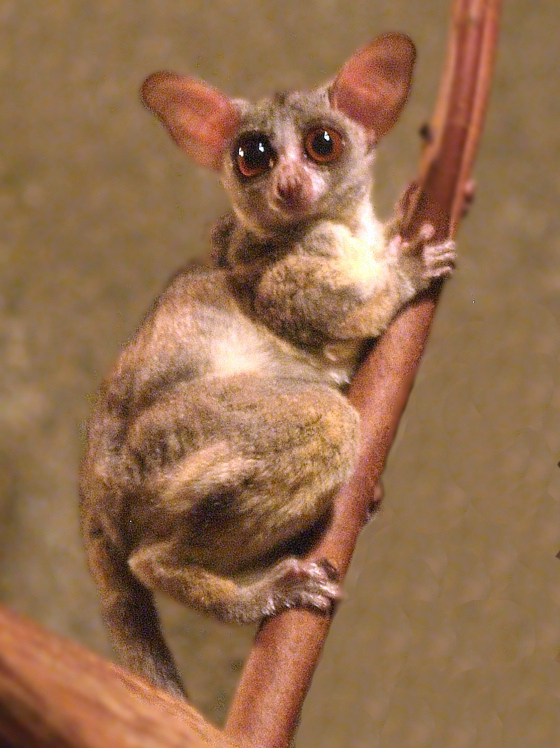
Senegal bushbaby

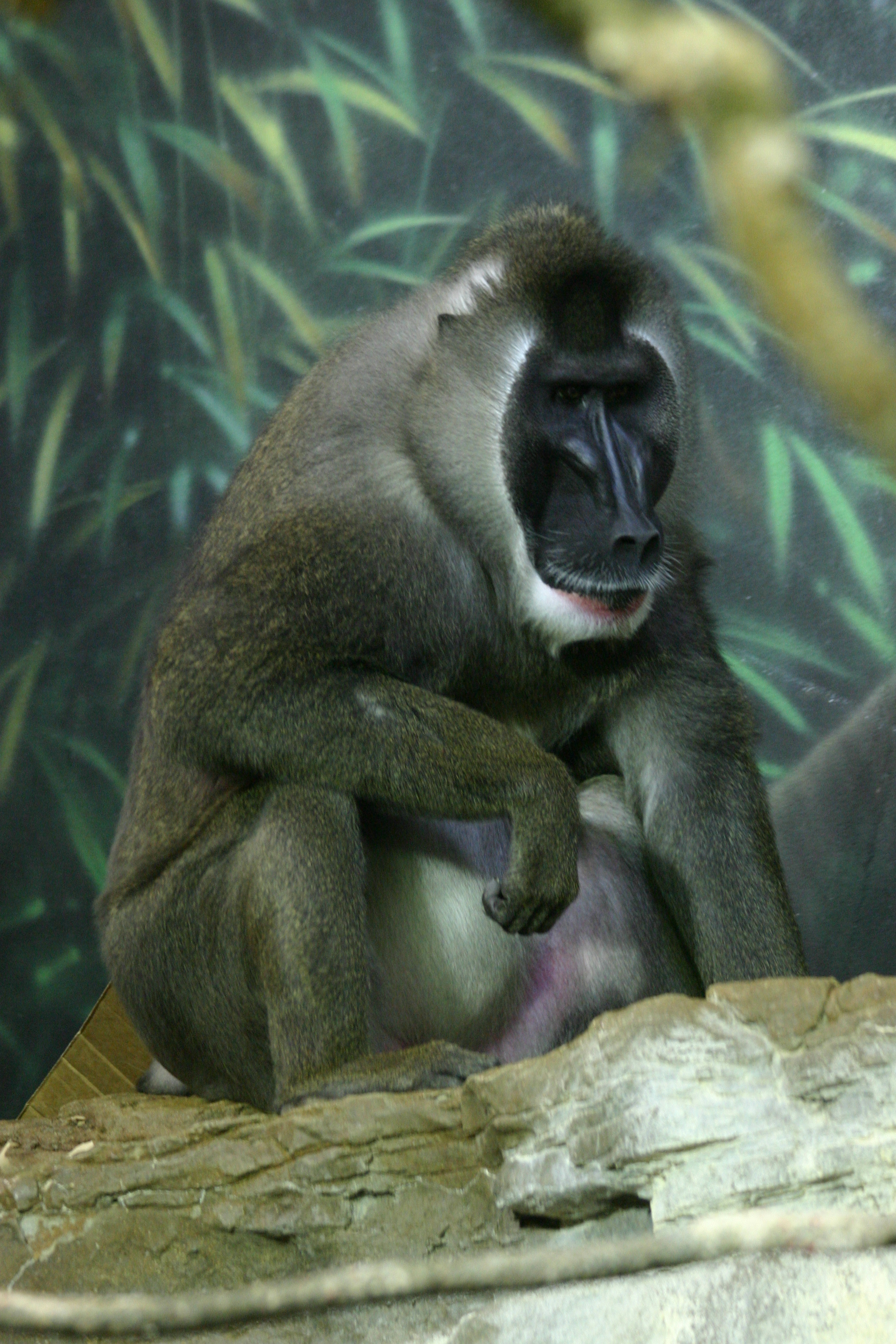
Drill

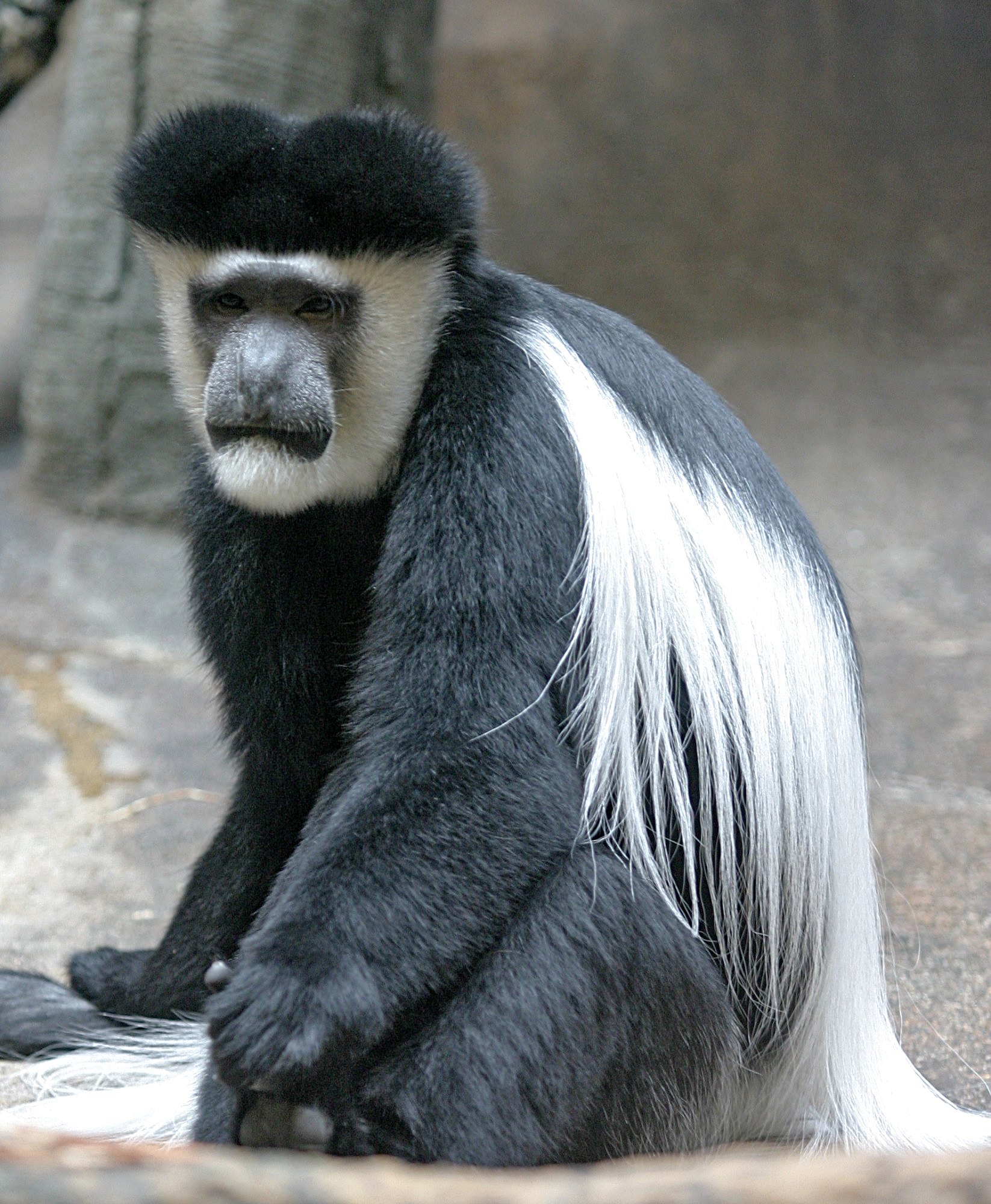
Mantled guereza

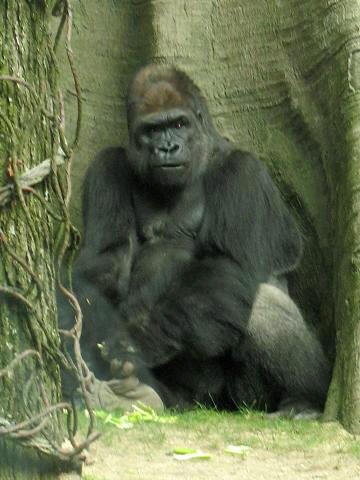
Western gorilla

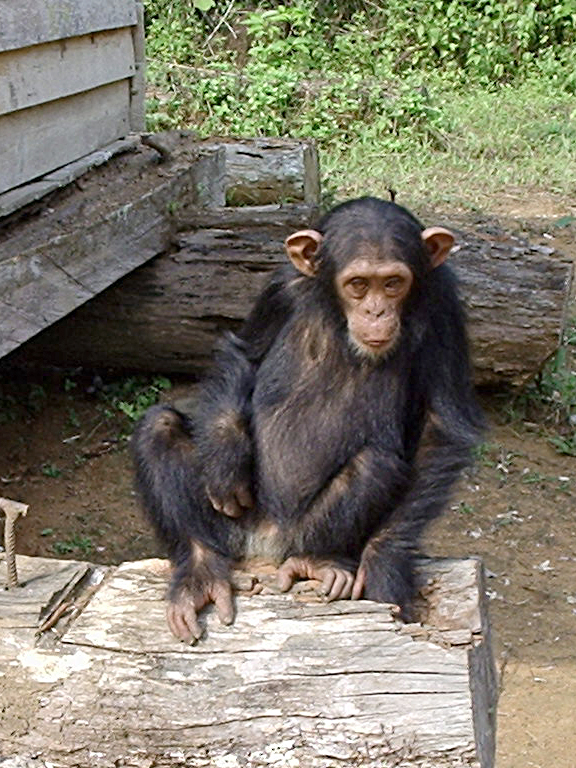
Common chimpanzee in Cameroon's South Province

The order Primates contains humans and their closest relatives: lemurs, lorisoids, tarsiers, monkeys, and apes.

- Suborder: Strepsirrhini
  - Infraorder: Lemuriformes
    - Superfamily: Lorisoidea
      - Family: Lorisidae
        - Genus: Arctocebus
          - Golden angwantibo, Arctocebus aureus LR/nt
          - Calabar angwantibo, Arctocebus calabarensis LR/nt
        - Genus: Perodicticus
          - Potto, Perodicticus potto LR/lc
      - Family: Galagidae
        - Genus: Sciurocheirus
          - Bioko Allen's bushbaby, Sciurocheirus alleni LR/nt
          - Cross River bushbaby, Sciurocheirus cameronensis LR/lc
        - Genus: Galago
          - Senegal bushbaby, Galago senegalensis LR/lc
        - Genus: Galagoides
          - Prince Demidoff's bushbaby, Galagoides demidovii LR/lc
          - Thomas's bushbaby, Galagoides thomasi LR/lc
        - Genus: Euoticus
          - Southern needle-clawed bushbaby, Euoticus elegantulus LR/nt
          - Northern needle-clawed bushbaby, Euoticus pallidus LR/nt
- Suborder: Haplorhini
  - Infraorder: Simiiformes
    - Parvorder: Catarrhini
      - Superfamily: Cercopithecoidea
        - Family: Cercopithecidae (Old World monkeys)
          - Genus: Allenopithecus
            - Allen's swamp monkey, Allenopithecus nigroviridis LR/nt
          - Genus: Miopithecus
            - Gabon talapoin, Miopithecus ogouensis LR/lc
          - Genus: Erythrocebus
            - Patas monkey, Erythrocebus patas LR/lc
          - Genus: Chlorocebus
            - Tantalus monkey, Chlorocebus tantalus LR/lc
          - Genus: Cercopithecus
            - Red-tailed monkey, Cercopithecus ascanius LR/lc
            - Moustached guenon, Cercopithecus cephus LR/lc
            - Red-eared guenon, Cercopithecus erythrotis VU
            - Mona monkey, Cercopithecus mona LR/lc
            - De Brazza's monkey, Cercopithecus neglectus LR/lc
            - Greater spot-nosed monkey, Cercopithecus nictitans LR/lc
            - Crowned guenon, Cercopithecus pogonias LR/lc
            - Preuss's monkey, Cercopithecus preussi EN
          - Genus: Lophocebus
            - Grey-cheeked mangabey, Lophocebus albigena LR/lc
          - Genus: Papio
            - Olive baboon, Papio anubis LR/lc
          - Genus: Cercocebus
            - Collared mangabey, Cercocebus torquatus LR/nt
          - Genus: Mandrillus
            - Drill, Mandrillus leucophaeus EN
            - Mandrill, Mandrillus sphinx VU
          - Subfamily: Colobinae
            - Genus: Colobus
              - Mantled guereza, Colobus guereza LR/lc
              - Black colobus, Colobus satanas VU
            - Genus: Procolobus
              - Red colobus, Procolobus badius EN
              - Pennant's colobus, Procolobus pennantii EN
      - Superfamily: Hominoidea
        - Family: Hominidae (great apes)
          - Subfamily: Homininae
            - Tribe: Gorillini
              - Genus: Gorilla
                - Western gorilla, Gorilla gorilla EN
            - Tribe: Panini
              - Genus: Pan
                - Common chimpanzee, Pan troglodytes EN

== Order: Rodentia (rodents) ==
Rodents make up the largest order of mammals, with over 40% of mammalian species. They have two incisors in the upper and lower jaw which grow continually and must be kept short by gnawing. Most rodents are small though the capybara can weigh up to 45 kg (100 lb).

- Suborder: Hystricognathi
  - Family: Bathyergidae
    - Genus: Cryptomys
      - Nigerian mole-rat, Cryptomys foxi DD
  - Family: Hystricidae (Old World porcupines)
    - Genus: Atherurus
      - African brush-tailed porcupine, Atherurus africanus LC
    - Genus: Hystrix
      - Crested porcupine, Hystrix cristata LC
  - Family: Thryonomyidae (cane rats)
    - Genus: Thryonomys
      - Lesser cane rat, Thryonomys gregorianus LC
      - Greater cane rat, Thryonomys swinderianus LC
- Suborder: Sciurognathi
  - Family: Anomaluridae
    - Subfamily: Anomalurinae
      - Genus: Anomalurus
        - Lord Derby's scaly-tailed squirrel, Anomalurus derbianus LC
        - Dwarf scaly-tailed squirrel, Anomalurus pusillus LC
      - Genus: Anomalurops
        - Beecroft's scaly-tailed squirrel, Anomalurops beecrofti LC
    - Subfamily: Zenkerellinae
      - Genus: Idiurus
        - Long-eared flying mouse, Idiurus macrotis LC
        - Pygmy scaly-tailed flying squirrel, Idiurus zenkeri DD
      - Genus: Zenkerella
        - Flightless scaly-tailed squirrel, Zenkerella insignis DD
  - Family: Sciuridae (squirrels)
    - Subfamily: Xerinae
      - Tribe: Xerini
        - Genus: Xerus
          - Striped ground squirrel, Xerus erythropus LC
      - Tribe: Protoxerini
        - Genus: Epixerus
          - Baifran palm squirrel, Epixerus wilsoni DD
        - Genus: Funisciurus
          - Thomas's rope squirrel, Funisciurus anerythrus DD
          - Lady Burton's rope squirrel, Funisciurus isabella LC
          - Ribboned rope squirrel, Funisciurus lemniscatus DD
          - Red-cheeked rope squirrel, Funisciurus leucogenys DD
          - Fire-footed rope squirrel, Funisciurus pyrropus LC
        - Genus: Heliosciurus
          - Red-legged sun squirrel, Heliosciurus rufobrachium LC
        - Genus: Myosciurus
          - African pygmy squirrel, Myosciurus pumilio DD
        - Genus: Paraxerus
          - Cooper's mountain squirrel, Paraxerus cooperi DD
          - Green bush squirrel, Paraxerus poensis LC
        - Genus: Protoxerus
          - Forest giant squirrel, Protoxerus stangeri LC
  - Family: Gliridae (dormice)
    - Subfamily: Graphiurinae
      - Genus: Graphiurus
        - Christy's dormouse, Graphiurus christyi DD
        - Jentink's dormouse, Graphiurus crassicaudatus DD
        - Lorrain dormouse, Graphiurus lorraineus LC
        - Nagtglas's African dormouse, Graphiurus nagtglasii LC
        - Kellen's dormouse, Graphiurus kelleni DD
        - Silent dormouse, Graphiurus surdus DD
  - Family: Nesomyidae
    - Subfamily: Dendromurinae
      - Genus: Dendromus
        - Banana climbing mouse, Dendromus messorius LC
        - Cameroon climbing mouse, Dendromus oreas VU
      - Genus: Prionomys
        - Dollman's tree mouse, Prionomys batesi DD
      - Genus: Steatomys
        - Fat mouse, Steatomys pratensis LC
    - Subfamily: Cricetomyinae
      - Genus: Cricetomys
        - Emin's pouched rat, Cricetomys emini LC
  - Family: Muridae (mice, rats, voles, gerbils, hamsters, etc.)
    - Subfamily: Deomyinae
      - Genus: Acomys
        - Johan's spiny mouse, Acomys johannis LC
      - Genus: Deomys
        - Link rat, Deomys ferrugineus LC
      - Genus: Lophuromys
        - Dieterlen's brush-furred mouse, Lophuromys dieterleni VU
        - Fire-bellied brush-furred rat, Lophuromys nudicaudus LC
        - Mount Cameroon brush-furred rat, Lophuromys roseveari LC
        - Rusty-bellied brush-furred rat, Lophuromys sikapusi LC
      - Genus: Uranomys
        - Rudd's mouse, Uranomys ruddi LC
    - Subfamily: Otomyinae
      - Genus: Otomys
        - Burton's vlei rat, Otomys burtoni VU
        - Western vlei rat, Otomys occidentalis VU
    - Subfamily: Gerbillinae
      - Genus: Desmodilliscus
        - Pouched gerbil, Desmodilliscus braueri LC
      - Genus: Tatera
        - Kemp's gerbil, Tatera kempi LC
        - Fringe-tailed gerbil, Tatera robusta LC
      - Genus: Taterillus
        - Congo gerbil, Taterillus congicus LC
        - Gracile tateril, Taterillus gracilis LC
        - Lake Chad gerbil, Taterillus lacustris LC
    - Subfamily: Murinae
      - Genus: Aethomys
        - Hinde's rock rat, Aethomys hindei LC
        - Tinfields rock rat, Aethomys stannarius NT
      - Genus: Arvicanthis
        - Guinean grass rat, Arvicanthis rufinus LC
      - Genus: Colomys
        - African wading rat, Colomys goslingi LC
      - Genus: Dasymys
        - West African shaggy rat, Dasymys rufulus LC
      - Genus: Grammomys
        - Shining thicket rat, Grammomys rutilans LC
      - Genus: Heimyscus
        - African smoky mouse, Heimyscus fumosus LC
      - Genus: Hybomys
        - Eisentraut's striped mouse, Hybomys eisentrauti EN
        - Peters's striped mouse, Hybomys univittatus LC
      - Genus: Hylomyscus
        - Beaded wood mouse, Hylomyscus aeta LC
        - Mount Oku hylomyscus, Hylomyscus grandis CR
        - Little wood mouse, Hylomyscus parvus LC
        - Stella wood mouse, Hylomyscus stella LC
      - Genus: Lamottemys
        - Mount Oku rat, Lamottemys okuensis EN
      - Genus: Lemniscomys
        - Mittendorf's striped grass mouse, Lemniscomys mittendorfi DD
        - Typical striped grass mouse, Lemniscomys striatus LC
      - Genus: Malacomys
        - Big-eared swamp rat, Malacomys longipes LC
      - Genus: Mastomys
        - Guinea multimammate mouse, Mastomys erythroleucus LC
        - Verheyen's multimammate mouse, Mastomys kollmannspergeri LC
        - Natal multimammate mouse, Mastomys natalensis LC
      - Genus: Mus
        - African pygmy mouse, Mus minutoides LC
        - Peters's mouse, Mus setulosus LC
        - Thomas's pygmy mouse, Mus sorella LC
      - Genus: Mylomys
        - African groove-toothed rat, Mylomys dybowskii LC
      - Genus: Oenomys
        - Common rufous-nosed rat, Oenomys hypoxanthus LC
      - Genus: Praomys
        - Dalton's mouse, Praomys daltoni LC
        - Hartwig's soft-furred mouse, Praomys hartwigi EN
        - Jackson's soft-furred mouse, Praomys jacksoni LC
        - Cameroon soft-furred mouse, Praomys morio VU
        - Petter's soft-furred mouse, Praomys petteri LC
        - Tullberg's soft-furred mouse, Praomys tullbergi LC
      - Genus: Stochomys
        - Target rat, Stochomys longicaudatus LC

== Order: Lagomorpha (lagomorphs) ==
The lagomorphs comprise two families, Leporidae (hares and rabbits), and Ochotonidae (pikas). Though they can resemble rodents, and were classified as a superfamily in that order until the early 20th century, they have since been considered a separate order. They differ from rodents in a number of physical characteristics, such as having four incisors in the upper jaw rather than two.

- Family: Leporidae (rabbits, hares)
  - Genus: Lepus
    - Cape hare, Lepus capensis LR/lc
    - African savanna hare, Lepus microtis LR/lc

== Order: Erinaceomorpha (hedgehogs and gymnures) ==
The order Erinaceomorpha contains a single family, Erinaceidae, which comprise the hedgehogs and gymnures. The hedgehogs are easily recognised by their spines while gymnures look more like large rats.

- Family: Erinaceidae (hedgehogs)
  - Subfamily: Erinaceinae
    - Genus: Atelerix
      - Four-toed hedgehog, Atelerix albiventris LR/lc

== Order: Soricomorpha (shrews, moles, and solenodons) ==
The "shrew-forms" are insectivorous mammals. The shrews and solenodons closely resemble mice while the moles are stout-bodied burrowers.

- Family: Soricidae (shrews)
  - Subfamily: Crocidurinae
    - Genus: Crocidura
      - Hun shrew, Crocidura attila LC
      - Bates's shrew, Crocidura batesi LC
      - Long-footed shrew, Crocidura crenata LC
      - Crosse's shrew, Crocidura crossei LC
      - Dent's shrew, Crocidura denti LC
      - Long-tailed musk shrew, Crocidura dolichura LC
      - Eisentraut's shrew, Crocidura eisentrauti VU
      - Fox's shrew, Crocidura foxi LC
      - Savanna shrew, Crocidura fulvastra LC
      - Bicolored musk shrew, Crocidura fuscomurina LC
      - Goliath shrew, Crocidura goliath LC
      - Grasse's shrew, Crocidura grassei LC
      - Hildegarde's shrew, Crocidura hildegardeae LC
      - Lamotte's shrew, Crocidura lamottei LC
      - Butiaba naked-tailed shrew, Crocidura littoralis LC
      - Ludia's shrew, Crocidura ludia LC
      - Manenguba shrew, Crocidura manengubae VU
      - Nigerian shrew, Crocidura nigeriae LC
      - African giant shrew, Crocidura olivieri LC
      - Small-footed shrew, Crocidura parvipes LC
      - Cameroonian shrew, Crocidura picea EN
      - Fraser's musk shrew, Crocidura poensis LC
      - Roosevelt's shrew, Crocidura roosevelti LC
      - Turbo shrew, Crocidura turba LC
      - Savanna path shrew, Crocidura viaria LC
      - Voi shrew, Crocidura voi LC
      - Yankari shrew, Crocidura yankariensis LC
    - Genus: Paracrocidura
      - Lesser large-headed shrew, Paracrocidura schoutedeni LC
    - Genus: Suncus
      - Least dwarf shrew, Suncus infinitesimus LC
      - Remy's pygmy shrew, Suncus remyi LC
    - Genus: Sylvisorex
      - Cameroonian forest shrew, Sylvisorex camerunensis EN
      - Bioko forest shrew, Sylvisorex isabellae EN
      - Johnston's forest shrew, Sylvisorex johnstoni LC
      - Climbing shrew, Sylvisorex megalura LC
      - Mount Cameroon forest shrew, Sylvisorex morio VU
      - Greater forest shrew, Sylvisorex ollula LC
      - Rain forest shrew, Sylvisorex pluvialis DD
  - Subfamily: Myosoricinae
    - Genus: Congosorex
      - Lesser Congo shrew, Congosorex verheyeni LC
    - Genus: Myosorex
      - Oku mouse shrew, Myosorex okuensis EN
      - Rumpi mouse shrew, Myosorex rumpii CR

== Order: Chiroptera (bats) ==
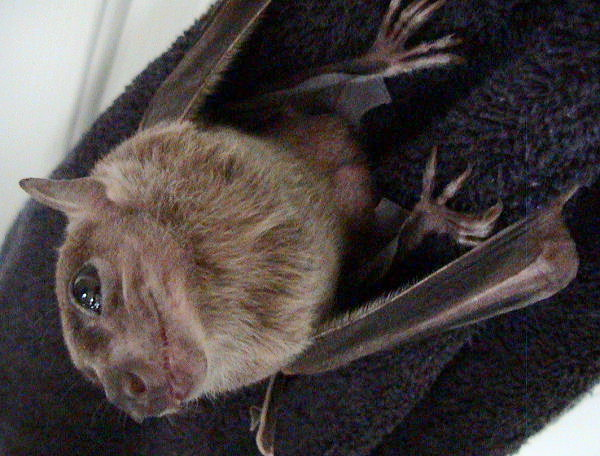
Egyptian fruit bat

The bats' most distinguishing feature is that their forelimbs are developed as wings, making them the only mammals capable of flight. Bat species account for about 20% of all mammals.

- Family: Pteropodidae (flying foxes, Old World fruit bats)
  - Subfamily: Pteropodinae
    - Genus: Casinycteris
      - Short-palated fruit bat, Casinycteris argynnis NT
    - Genus: Eidolon
      - Straw-coloured fruit bat, Eidolon helvum LC
    - Genus: Epomophorus
      - Gambian epauletted fruit bat, Epomophorus gambianus LC
      - Wahlberg's epauletted fruit bat, Epomophorus wahlbergi LC
    - Genus: Epomops
      - Franquet's epauletted fruit bat, Epomops franqueti LC
    - Genus: Hypsignathus
      - Hammer-headed bat, Hypsignathus monstrosus LC
    - Genus: Lissonycteris
      - Angolan rousette, Lissonycteris angolensis LC
    - Genus: Micropteropus
      - Peters's dwarf epauletted fruit bat, Micropteropus pusillus LC
    - Genus: Myonycteris
      - Little collared fruit bat, Myonycteris torquata LC
    - Genus: Nanonycteris
      - Veldkamp's dwarf epauletted fruit bat, Nanonycteris veldkampi LC
    - Genus: Rousettus
      - Egyptian fruit bat, Rousettus aegyptiacus LC
    - Genus: Scotonycteris
      - Pohle's fruit bat, Scotonycteris ophiodon EN
      - Zenker's fruit bat, Scotonycteris zenkeri NT
  - Subfamily: Macroglossinae
    - Genus: Megaloglossus
      - Woermann's bat, Megaloglossus woermanni LC
- Family: Vespertilionidae
  - Subfamily: Kerivoulinae
    - Genus: Kerivoula
      - Copper woolly bat, Kerivoula cuprosa NT
      - Spurrell's woolly bat, Kerivoula phalaena NT
      - Smith's woolly bat, Kerivoula smithi LC
  - Subfamily: Myotinae
    - Genus: Myotis
      - Rufous mouse-eared bat, Myotis bocagii LC
  - Subfamily: Vespertilioninae
    - Genus: Glauconycteris
      - Allen's striped bat, Glauconycteris alboguttata DD
      - Silvered bat, Glauconycteris argentata LC
      - Curry's bat, Glauconycteris curryae DD
      - Bibundi bat, Glauconycteris egeria DD
      - Glen's wattled bat, Glauconycteris gleni VU
      - Abo bat, Glauconycteris poensis LC
      - Butterfly bat, Glauconycteris variegata LC
    - Genus: Hypsugo
      - Broad-headed pipistrelle, Hypsugo crassulus LC
      - Eisentraut's pipistrelle, Hypsugo eisentrauti DD
      - Mouselike pipistrelle, Hypsugo musciculus DD
    - Genus: Mimetillus
      - Moloney's mimic bat, Mimetillus moloneyi LC
    - Genus: Neoromicia
      - Dark-brown serotine, Neoromicia brunneus NT
      - Cape serotine, Neoromicia capensis LC
      - Yellow serotine, Neoromicia flavescens DD
      - Tiny serotine, Neoromicia guineensis LC
      - Banana pipistrelle, Neoromicia nanus LC
      - Rendall's serotine, Neoromicia rendalli LC
      - Somali serotine, Neoromicia somalicus LC
      - White-winged serotine, Neoromicia tenuipinnis LC
    - Genus: Nycticeinops
      - Schlieffen's bat, Nycticeinops schlieffeni LC
    - Genus: Pipistrellus
      - Aellen's pipistrelle, Pipistrellus inexspectatus DD
      - Tiny pipistrelle, Pipistrellus nanulus LC
      - Least pipistrelle, Pipistrellus tenuis LR/lc
    - Genus: Scotoecus
      - Hinde's lesser house bat, Scotoecus hindei DD
      - Dark-winged lesser house bat, Scotoecus hirundo DD
    - Genus: Scotophilus
      - African yellow bat, Scotophilus dinganii LC
      - White-bellied yellow bat, Scotophilus leucogaster LC
      - Nut-colored yellow bat, Scotophilus nux LC
      - Greenish yellow bat, Scotophilus viridis LC
  - Subfamily: Miniopterinae
    - Genus: Miniopterus
      - Greater long-fingered bat, Miniopterus inflatus LC
      - Common bent-wing bat, Miniopterus schreibersii LC
- Family: Rhinopomatidae
  - Genus: Rhinopoma
    - Egyptian mouse-tailed bat, R. cystops LC
- Family: Molossidae
  - Genus: Chaerephon
    - Duke of Abruzzi's free-tailed bat, Chaerephon aloysiisabaudiae NT
    - Ansorge's free-tailed bat, Chaerephon ansorgei LC
    - Gland-tailed free-tailed bat, Chaerephon bemmeleni LC
    - Nigerian free-tailed bat, Chaerephon nigeriae LC
    - Russet free-tailed bat, Chaerephon russata NT
  - Genus: Mops
    - Sierra Leone free-tailed bat, Mops brachypterus LC
    - Medje free-tailed bat, Mops congicus NT
    - Mongalla free-tailed bat, Mops demonstrator NT
    - Dwarf free-tailed bat, Mops nanulus LC
    - Peterson's free-tailed bat, Mops petersoni VU
    - Spurrell's free-tailed bat, Mops spurrelli LC
    - Railer bat, Mops thersites LC
  - Genus: Myopterus
    - Bini free-tailed bat, Myopterus whitleyi LC
- Family: Emballonuridae
  - Genus: Saccolaimus
    - Pel's pouched bat, Saccolaimus peli NT
- Family: Nycteridae
  - Genus: Nycteris
    - Bate's slit-faced bat, Nycteris arge LC
    - Gambian slit-faced bat, Nycteris gambiensis LC
    - Large slit-faced bat, Nycteris grandis LC
    - Hairy slit-faced bat, Nycteris hispida LC
    - Intermediate slit-faced bat, Nycteris intermedia NT
    - Large-eared slit-faced bat, Nycteris macrotis LC
    - Ja slit-faced bat, Nycteris major VU
    - Dwarf slit-faced bat, Nycteris nana LC
    - Parissi's slit-faced bat, Nycteris parisii DD
    - Egyptian slit-faced bat, Nycteris thebaica LC
- Family: Megadermatidae
  - Genus: Lavia
    - Yellow-winged bat, Lavia frons LC
- Family: Rhinolophidae
  - Subfamily: Rhinolophinae
    - Genus: Rhinolophus
      - Halcyon horseshoe bat, Rhinolophus alcyone LC
      - Rüppell's horseshoe bat, Rhinolophus fumigatus LC
      - Hill's horseshoe bat, Rhinolophus hillorum VU
      - Lander's horseshoe bat, Rhinolophus landeri LC
      - Bushveld horseshoe bat, Rhinolophus simulator LC
  - Subfamily: Hipposiderinae
    - Genus: Hipposideros
      - Aba roundleaf bat, Hipposideros abae NT
      - Benito roundleaf bat, Hipposideros beatus LC
      - Sundevall's roundleaf bat, Hipposideros caffer LC
      - Greater roundleaf bat, Hipposideros camerunensis DD
      - Short-tailed roundleaf bat, Hipposideros curtus VU
      - Cyclops roundleaf bat, Hipposideros cyclops LC
      - Sooty roundleaf bat, Hipposideros fuliginosus NT
      - Giant roundleaf bat, Hipposideros gigas LC
      - Noack's roundleaf bat, Hipposideros ruber LC

== Order: Pholidota (pangolins) ==
The order Pholidota comprises the eight species of pangolin. Pangolins are anteaters and have the powerful claws, elongated snout and long tongue seen in the other unrelated anteater species.

- Family: Manidae
  - Genus: Manis
    - Giant pangolin, Manis gigantea LR/lc
    - Long-tailed pangolin, Manis tetradactyla LR/lc
    - Tree pangolin, Manis tricuspis LR/lc

== Order: Cetacea (whales) ==
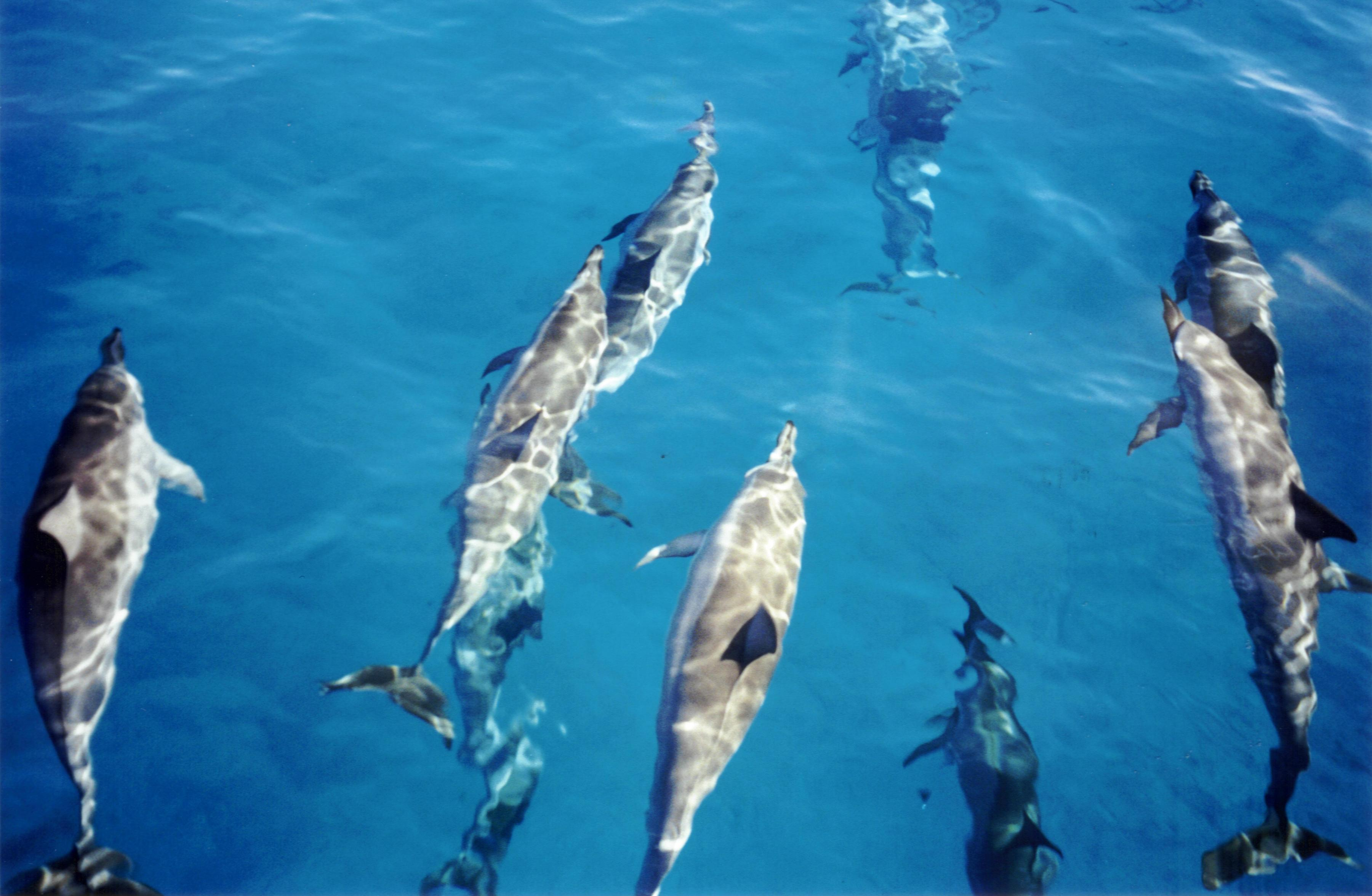
Spinner dolphin

The order Cetacea includes whales, dolphins and porpoises. They are the mammals most fully adapted to aquatic life with a spindle-shaped nearly hairless body, protected by a thick layer of blubber, and forelimbs and tail modified to provide propulsion underwater.

- Suborder: Mysticeti
  - Family: Balaenopteridae
    - Subfamily: Balaenopterinae
      - Genus: Balaenoptera
        - Common minke whale, Balaenoptera acutorostrata LC
        - Antarctic minke whale, Balaenoptera bonaerensis DD
        - Sei whale, Balaenoptera borealis EN
        - Bryde's whale, Balaenoptera edeni DD
        - Blue whale, Balaenoptera musculus EN
        - Fin whale, Balaenoptera physalus EN
    - Subfamily: Megapterinae
      - Genus: Megaptera
        - Humpback whale, Megaptera novaeangliae VU
- Suborder: Odontoceti
  - Superfamily: Platanistoidea
    - Family: Physeteridae
      - Genus: Physeter
        - Sperm whale, Physeter macrocephalus VU
    - Family: Kogiidae
      - Genus: Kogia
        - Pygmy sperm whale, Kogia breviceps LR/lc
        - Dwarf sperm whale, Kogia sima LR/lc
    - Family: Ziphidae
      - Subfamily: Hyperoodontinae
        - Genus: Mesoplodon
          - Blainville's beaked whale, Mesoplodon densirostris DD
          - Gervais' beaked whale, Mesoplodon europaeus DD
        - Genus: Ziphius
          - Cuvier's beaked whale, Ziphius cavirostris DD
    - Family: Delphinidae (marine dolphins)
      - Genus: Steno
        - Rough-toothed dolphin, Steno bredanensis DD
      - Genus: Tursiops
        - Common bottlenose dolphin, Tursiops truncatus LC
      - Genus: Delphinus
        - Long-beaked common dolphin, Delphinus capensis DD
      - Genus: Stenella
        - Pantropical spotted dolphin, Stenella attenuata LR/cd
        - Striped dolphin, Stenella coeruleoalba LR/cd
        - Atlantic spotted dolphin, Stenella frontalis DD
        - Clymene dolphin, Stenella clymene DD
        - Spinner dolphin, Stenella longirostris LR/cd
      - Genus: Lagenodelphis
        - Fraser's dolphin, Lagenodelphis hosei DD
      - Genus: Sousa
        - Atlantic humpback dolphin, Sousa teuszii
      - Genus: Orcinus
        - Orca, Orcinus orca LR/cd
      - Genus: Feresa
        - Pygmy killer whale, Feresa attenuata DD
      - Genus: Pseudorca
        - False killer whale, Pseudorca crassidens LR/lc
      - Genus: Globicephala
        - Short-finned pilot whale, Globicephala macrorhynchus LR/cd
      - Genus: Peponocephala
        - Melon-headed whale, Peponocephala electra DD

== Order: Carnivora (carnivorans) ==
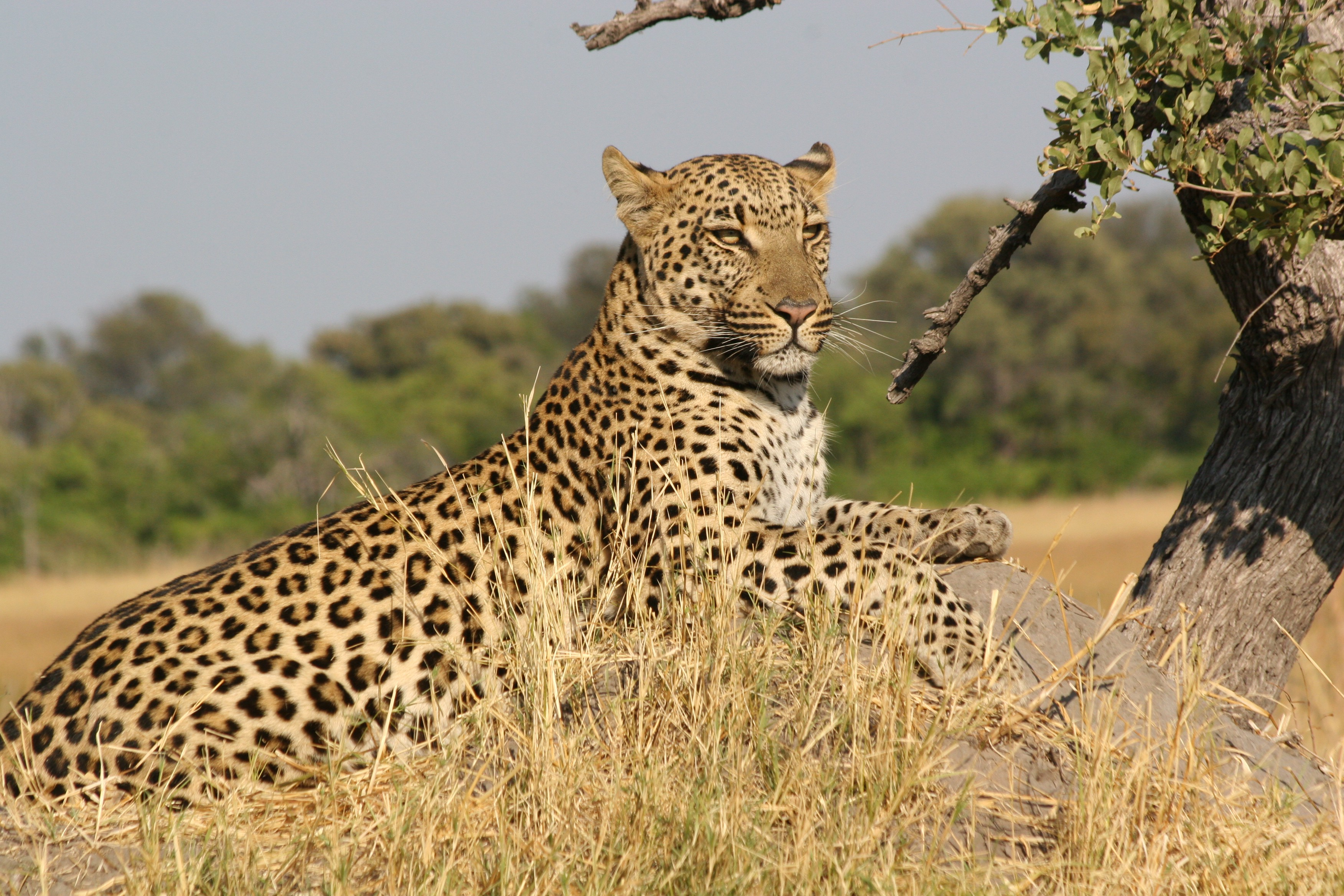
African leopard

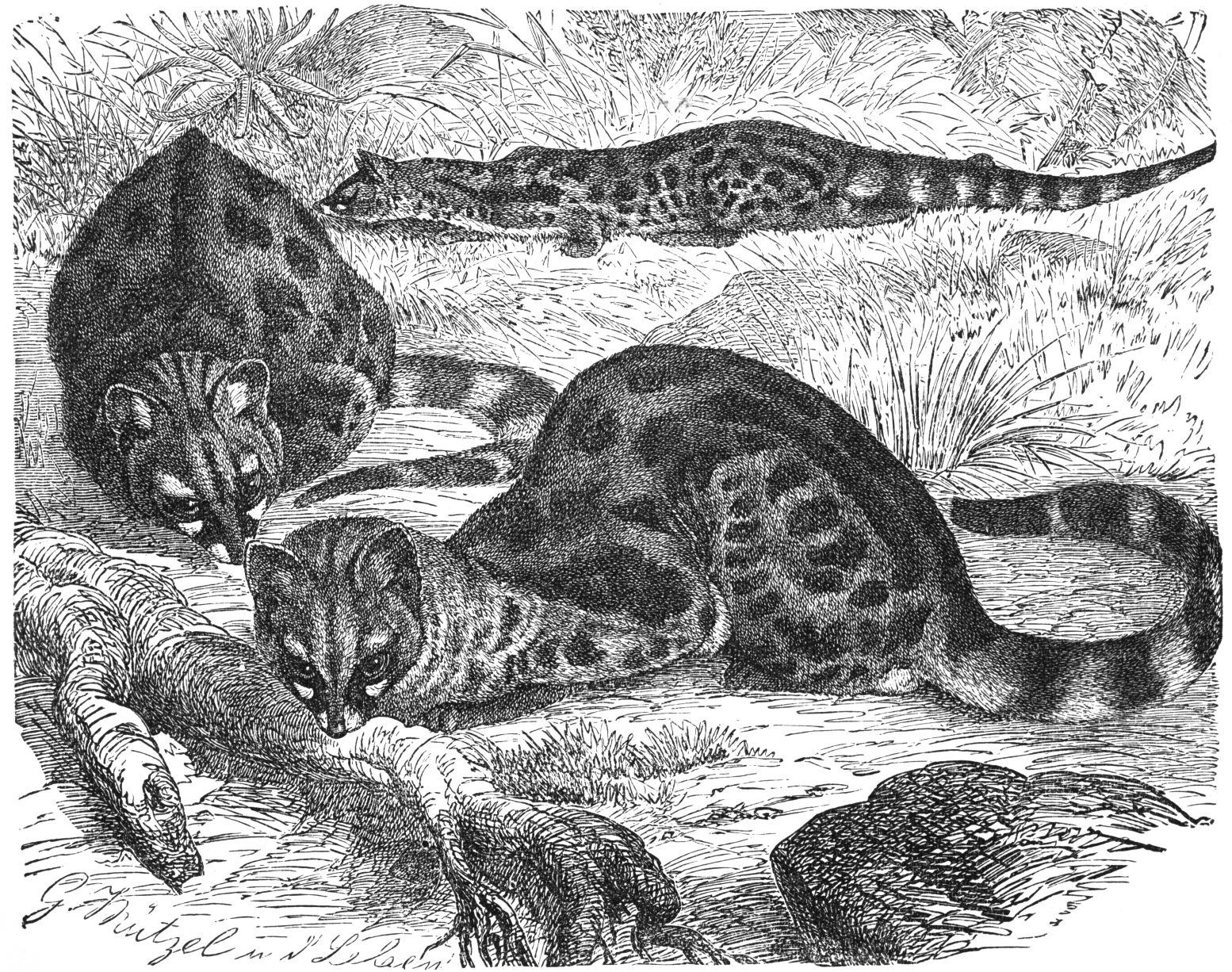
[Common genet

There are over 260 species of carnivorans, the majority of which feed primarily on meat. They have a characteristic skull shape and dentition.

- Suborder: Feliformia
  - Family: Felidae (cats)
    - Subfamily: Felinae
      - Genus: Caracal
        - African golden cat, C. aurata VU
        - Caracal, C. caracal LC
      - Genus: Leptailurus
        - Serval, L. serval LC
    - Subfamily: Pantherinae
      - Genus: Panthera
        - Lion, P. leo VU
        - Leopard, P. pardus VU
  - Family: Viverridae
    - Subfamily: Viverrinae
      - Genus: Civettictis
        - African civet, C. civetta LC
      - Genus: Genetta
        - Crested servaline genet, G. cristata VU
        - Common genet, G. genetta LC
        - Rusty-spotted genet, Genetta maculata LC
        - Servaline genet, Genetta servalina LC
        - Hausa genet, Genetta thierryi LC
      - Genus: Poiana
        - Central African oyan, P. richardsonii LC
  - Family: Nandiniidae
    - Genus: Nandinia
      - African palm civet, Nandinia binotata LC
  - Family: Herpestidae (mongooses)
    - Genus: Atilax
      - Marsh mongoose, Atilax paludinosus LC
    - Genus: Bdeogale
      - Black-footed mongoose, Bdeogale nigripes LC
    - Genus: Crossarchus
      - Flat-headed kusimanse, Crossarchus platycephalus LC
    - Genus: Herpestes
      - Egyptian mongoose, Herpestes ichneumon LC
      - Common slender mongoose, Herpestes sanguineus LC
    - Genus: Mungos
      - Banded mongoose, Mungos mungo LC
    - Genus: Xenogale
      - Long-nosed mongoose, Xenogale naso LC
  - Family: Hyaenidae (hyaenas)
    - Genus: Crocuta
      - Spotted hyena, Crocuta crocuta LC
    - Genus: Hyaena
      - Striped hyena, H. hyaena LC
- Suborder: Caniformia
  - Family: Canidae (dogs, foxes)
    - Genus: Canis
      - African golden wolf, C. lupaster LC
    - Genus: Lupulella
      - Side-striped jackal, L. adusta LC
    - Genus: Lycaon
      - African wild dog, L. pictus EN extirpated
    - Genus: Vulpes
      - Pale fox, V. pallida LC
  - Family: Mustelidae (mustelids)
    - Genus: Ictonyx
      - Striped polecat, Ictonyx striatus LC
    - Genus: Mellivora
      - Honey badger, M. capensis LC
    - Genus: Hydrictis
      - Speckle-throated otter, Hydrictis maculicollis LC
    - Genus: Aonyx
      - African clawless otter, Aonyx capensis LC
      - Congo clawless otter, Aonyx congicus NT

== Order: Perissodactyla (odd-toed ungulates) ==
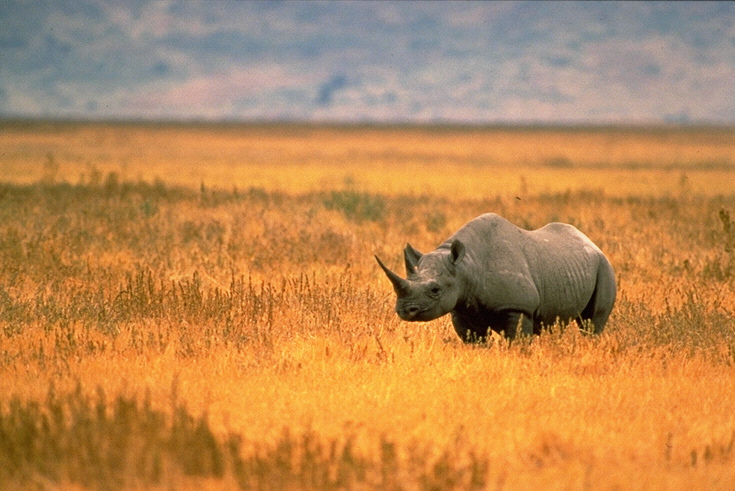
Black rhinoceros

The odd-toed ungulates are browsing and grazing mammals. They are usually large to very large, and have relatively simple stomachs and a large middle toe.

- Family: Rhinocerotidae
  - Genus: Diceros
    - Western black rhinoceros, Diceros bicornis longipes EX

== Order: Artiodactyla (even-toed ungulates) ==
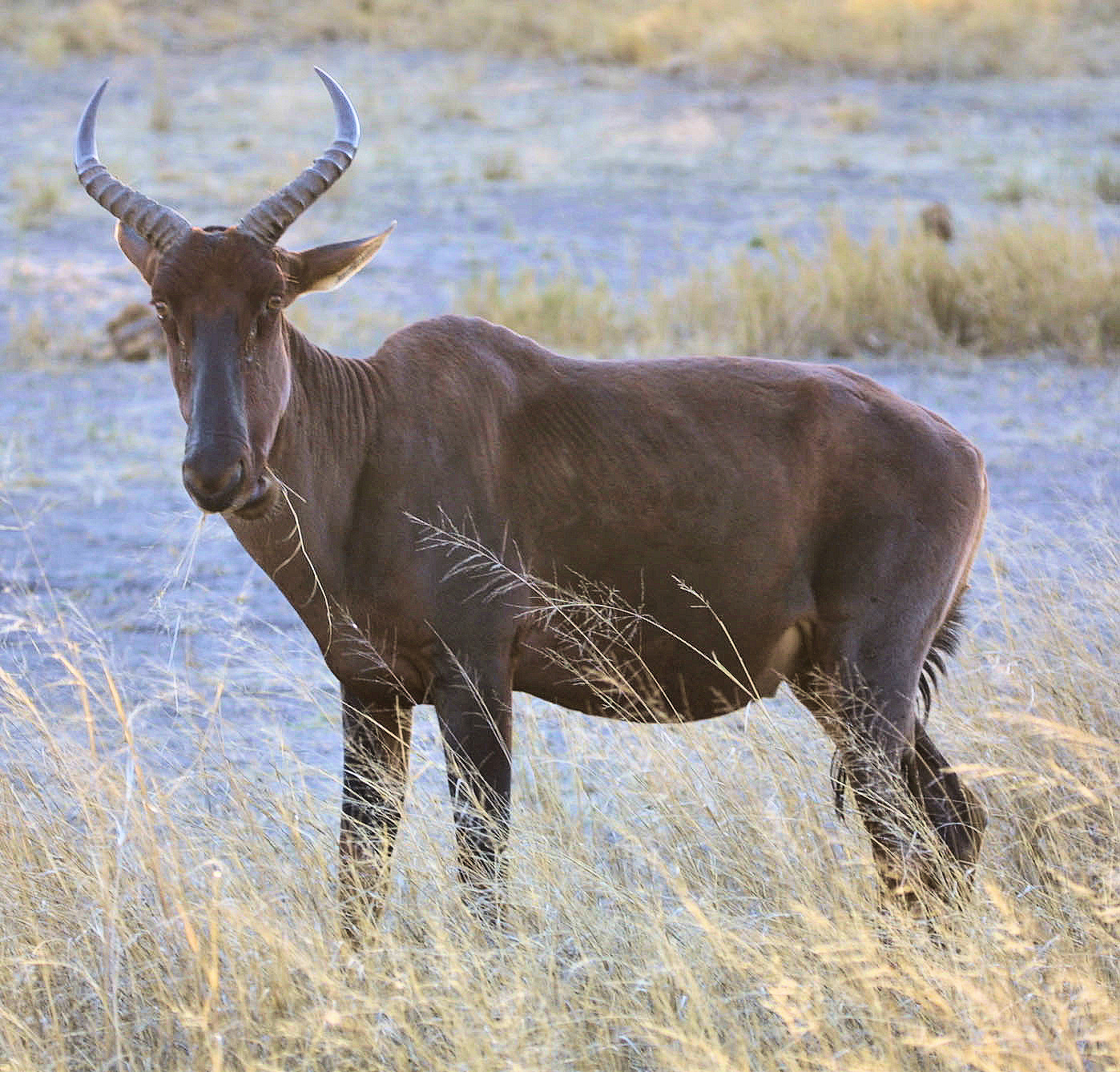
Topi

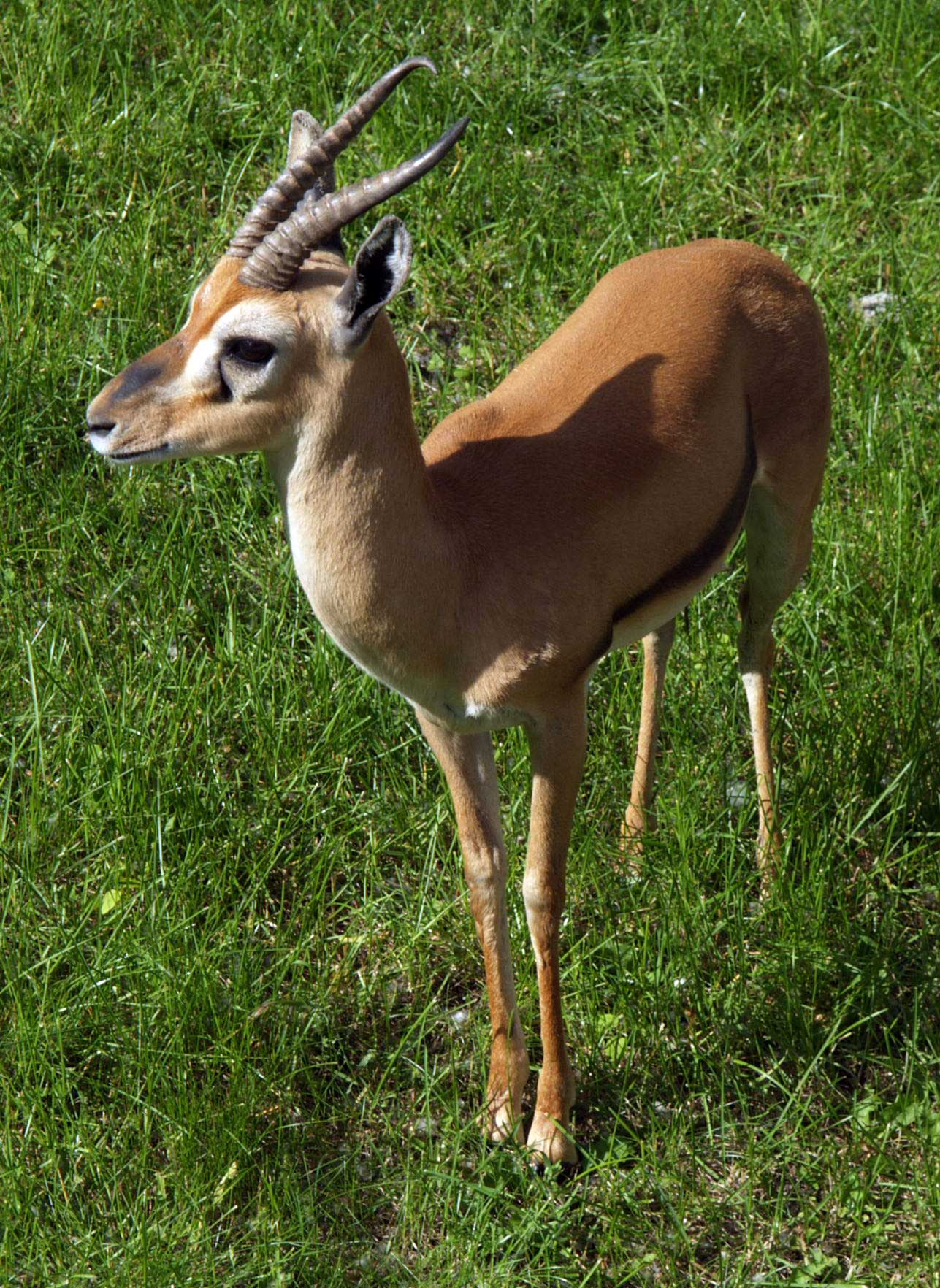
Red-fronted gazelle

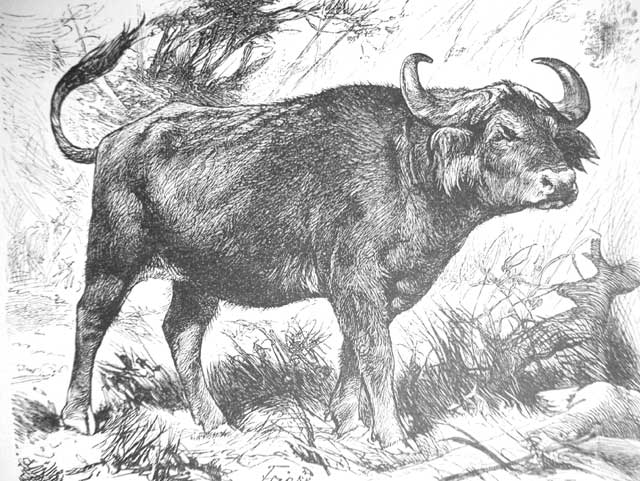
African buffalo

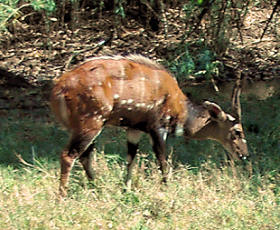
Bushbuck

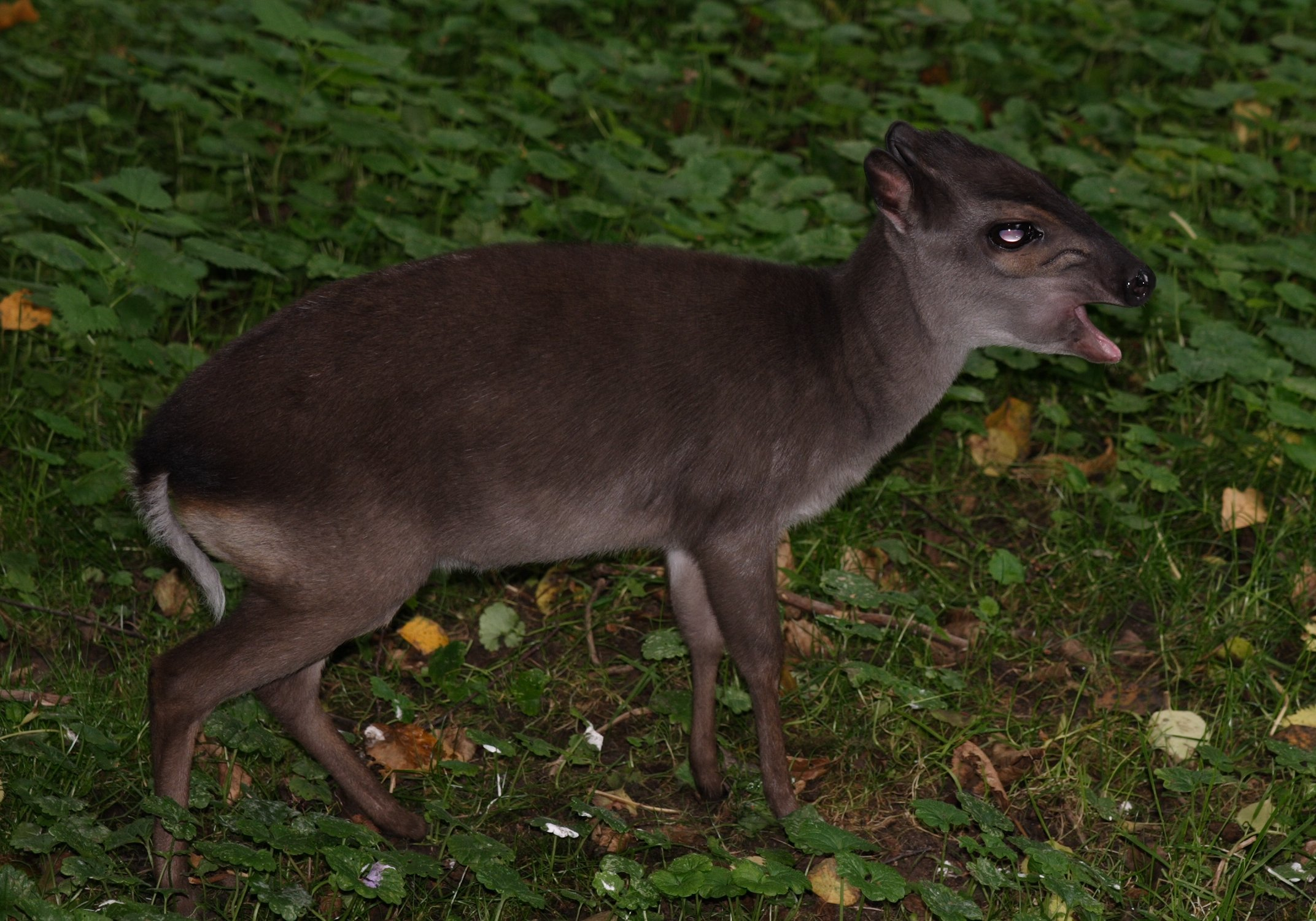
Blue duiker

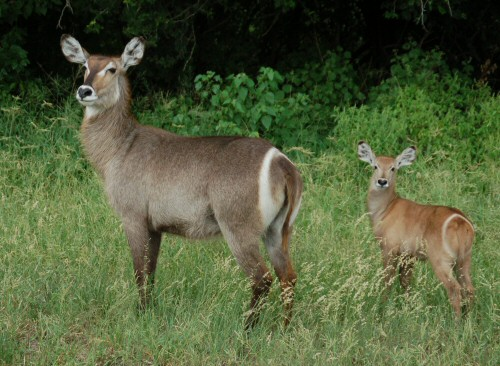
Waterbuck

The even-toed ungulates are ungulates whose weight is borne about equally by the third and fourth toes, rather than mostly or entirely by the third as in perissodactyls. There are about 220 artiodactyl species, including many that are of great economic importance to humans.

- Family: Suidae (pigs)
  - Subfamily: Phacochoerinae
    - Genus: Phacochoerus
      - Common warthog, Phacochoerus africanus LR/lc
  - Subfamily: Suinae
    - Genus: Hylochoerus
      - Giant forest hog, Hylochoerus meinertzhageni LR/lc
    - Genus: Potamochoerus
      - Red river hog, Potamochoerus porcus LR/lc
- Family: Hippopotamidae (hippopotamuses)
  - Genus: Hippopotamus
    - Hippopotamus, Hippopotamus amphibius VU
- Family: Tragulidae
  - Genus: Hyemoschus
    - Water chevrotain, Hyemoschus aquaticus DD
- Family: Giraffidae (giraffe, okapi)
  - Genus: Giraffa
    - West African giraffe, Giraffa camelopardalis peralta EN
- Family: Bovidae (cattle, antelope, sheep, goats)
  - Subfamily: Alcelaphinae
    - Genus: Alcelaphus
      - Hartebeest, Alcelaphus buselaphus LR/cd
    - Genus: Damaliscus
      - Topi, Damaliscus lunatus LR/cd
  - Subfamily: Antilopinae
    - Genus: Gazella
      - Dama gazelle, Gazella dama CR
      - Red-fronted gazelle, Gazella rufifrons VU
    - Genus: Neotragus
      - Bates's pygmy antelope, Neotragus batesi LR/nt
    - Genus: Ourebia
      - Oribi, Ourebia ourebi LR/cd
  - Subfamily: Bovinae
    - Genus: Syncerus
      - African buffalo, Syncerus caffer LR/cd
    - Genus: Tragelaphus
      - Giant eland, Tragelaphus derbianus LR/nt
      - Bongo, Tragelaphus eurycerus LR/nt
      - Bushbuck, Tragelaphus scriptus LR/lc
      - Sitatunga, Tragelaphus spekii LR/nt
  - Subfamily: Cephalophinae
    - Genus: Cephalophus
      - Peters's duiker, Cephalophus callipygus LR/nt
      - Bay duiker, Cephalophus dorsalis LR/nt
      - White-bellied duiker, Cephalophus leucogaster LR/nt
      - Blue duiker, Cephalophus monticola LR/lc
      - Black-fronted duiker, Cephalophus nigrifrons LR/nt
      - Ogilby's duiker, Cephalophus ogilbyi LR/nt
      - Red-flanked duiker, Cephalophus rufilatus LR/cd
      - Yellow-backed duiker, Cephalophus silvicultor LR/nt
    - Genus: Sylvicapra
      - Common duiker, Sylvicapra grimmia LR/lc
  - Subfamily: Hippotraginae
    - Genus: Hippotragus
      - Roan antelope, Hippotragus equinus LR/cd
  - Subfamily: Reduncinae
    - Genus: Kobus
      - Waterbuck, Kobus ellipsiprymnus LR/cd
      - Kob, Kobus kob LR/cd
    - Genus: Redunca
      - Mountain reedbuck, Redunca fulvorufula LC
      - Bohor reedbuck, Redunca redunca LR/cd

== See also ==
- List of chordate orders
- Lists of mammals by region
- List of prehistoric mammals
- Mammal classification
- List of mammals described in the 2000s
