= Campo-Ma'an fruit bat =

Conservation status
- Data Deficient (IUCN 3.1)

Scientific classification
- Kingdom: Animalia
- Phylum: Chordata
- Class: Mammalia
- Order: Chiroptera
- Family: Pteropodidae
- Genus: Casinycteris
- Species: C. campomaanensis

Binomial name
- Casinycteris campomaanensis Hassanin, 2014
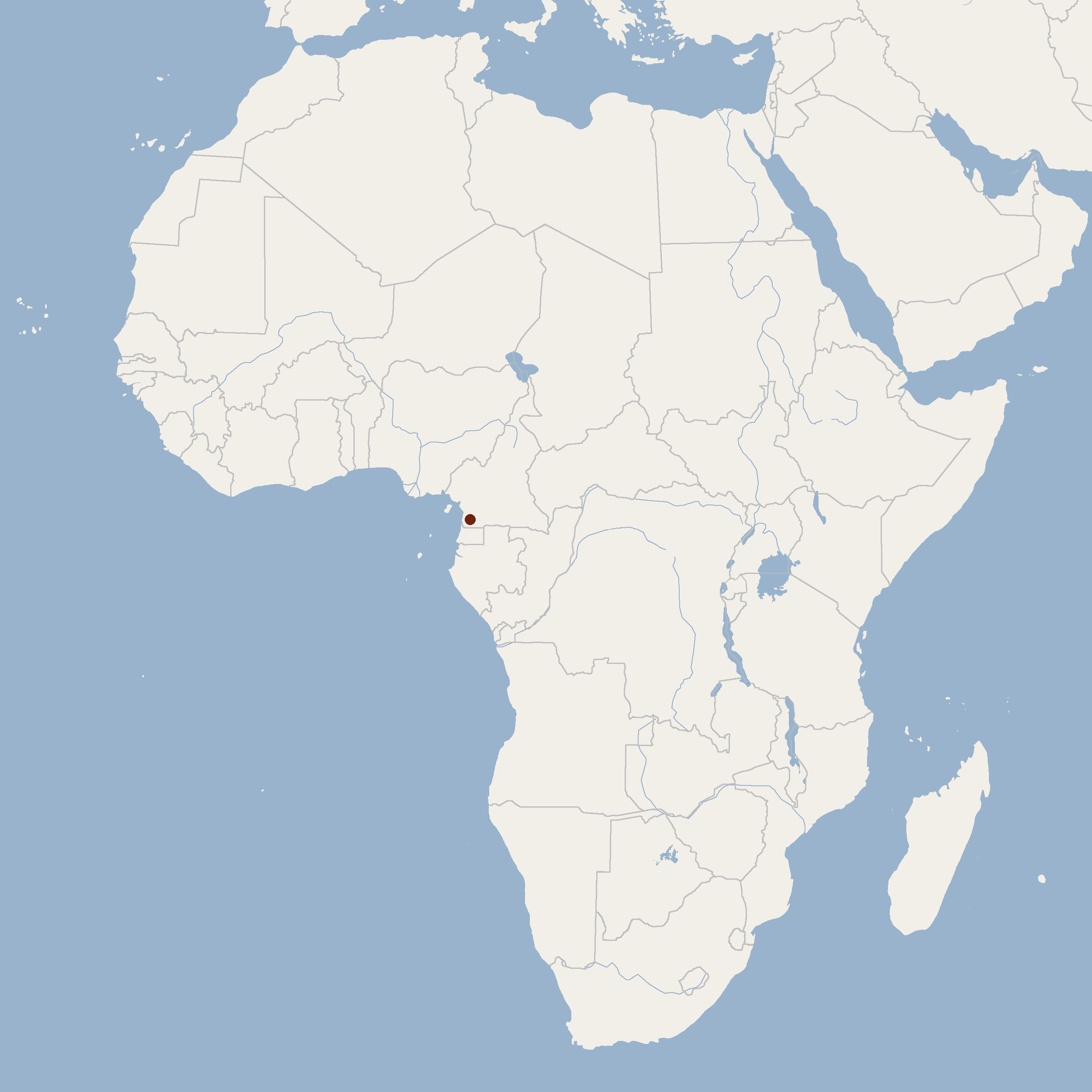
- Confirmed range of C. campomaanensis

Species of bat

The Campo-Ma'an fruit bat (Casinycteris campomaanensis) is a species of bat found in Cameroon. The first individual encountered was in 2007. It was described as a new species in 2014. Only three individuals have ever been encountered.

== Taxonomy and etymology ==
It joins the short-palated fruit bat as a member of the genus Casinycteris. It has been suggested that Pohle's fruit bat should be moved from its current genus Scotonycteris to this genus as well. It differs from other bats of the Casinycteris and Scotonycteris genera by its intermediate body mass and skull morphology. The species name campomaanensis is a reference to Campo Ma'an National Park, which is close to where the first individual was found.

== Description ==
The Campo-Ma-an fruit bat weighs approximately 49 g (1.7 oz) and has a forearm length of 73 mm (2.9 in). Their dorsal fur is rusty brown in color, while their ventral side is a lighter brown. Their throats, breasts, and bellies are whitish. They have several white markings on their face, such as a spot on the top of the snout, a chevron from the outer corner of each eye, a broad band around the lips, and an indistinct tuft in front of each ear. The skin of the snout is greenish-yellow with the exception of the nostrils, which are distinctly reddish. Their upper and lower eyelids are also greenish-yellow. The patagium of the wings is brown, while their finger joints are yellow. They lack a tail. They have 28 teeth in total, with a dental formula of 2.1.2.12.1.3.2. They have robust skulls with pronounced zygomatic arches.

== Range and habitat ==
This species is found in the Atlantic Equatorial coastal forests, an ecoregion of Central Africa. This region is hilly, with elevation ranging from 0–500 m (0–1,640 ft) above sea level. It is thought that at least some of the bat's habitat occurs in Campo Ma'an National Park, which is protected land. So far, it has been definitively identified in Cameroon, although a bat specimen collected in the past could mean that it is also present in Republic of the Congo. It has possibly been identified in Nigeria as well.

As nothing is known about its range size, population number, or population trend, the IUCN lists it as data deficient.
