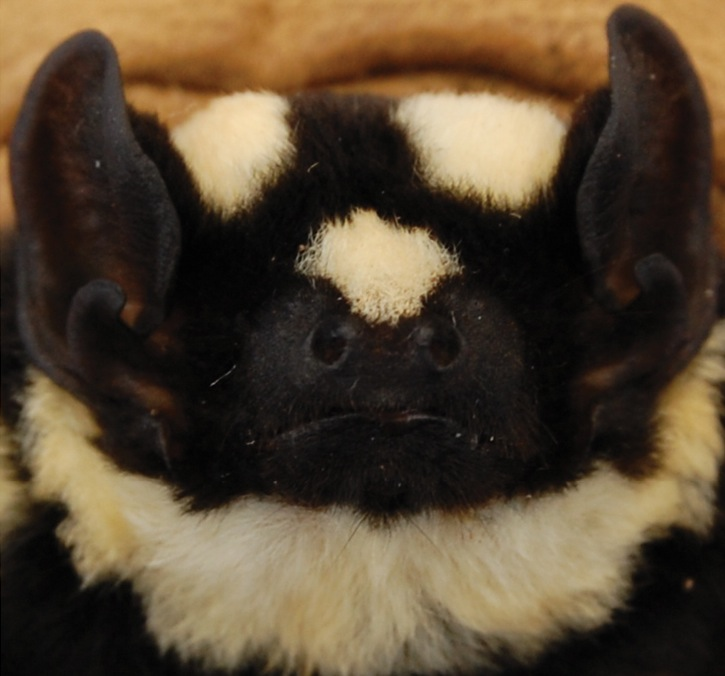

Conservation status
- Least Concern (IUCN 3.1)

Scientific classification
- Kingdom: Animalia
- Phylum: Chordata
- Class: Mammalia
- Order: Chiroptera
- Family: Vespertilionidae
- Genus: Glauconycteris
- Species: G. superba

Binomial name
- Glauconycteris superba Hayman, 1939
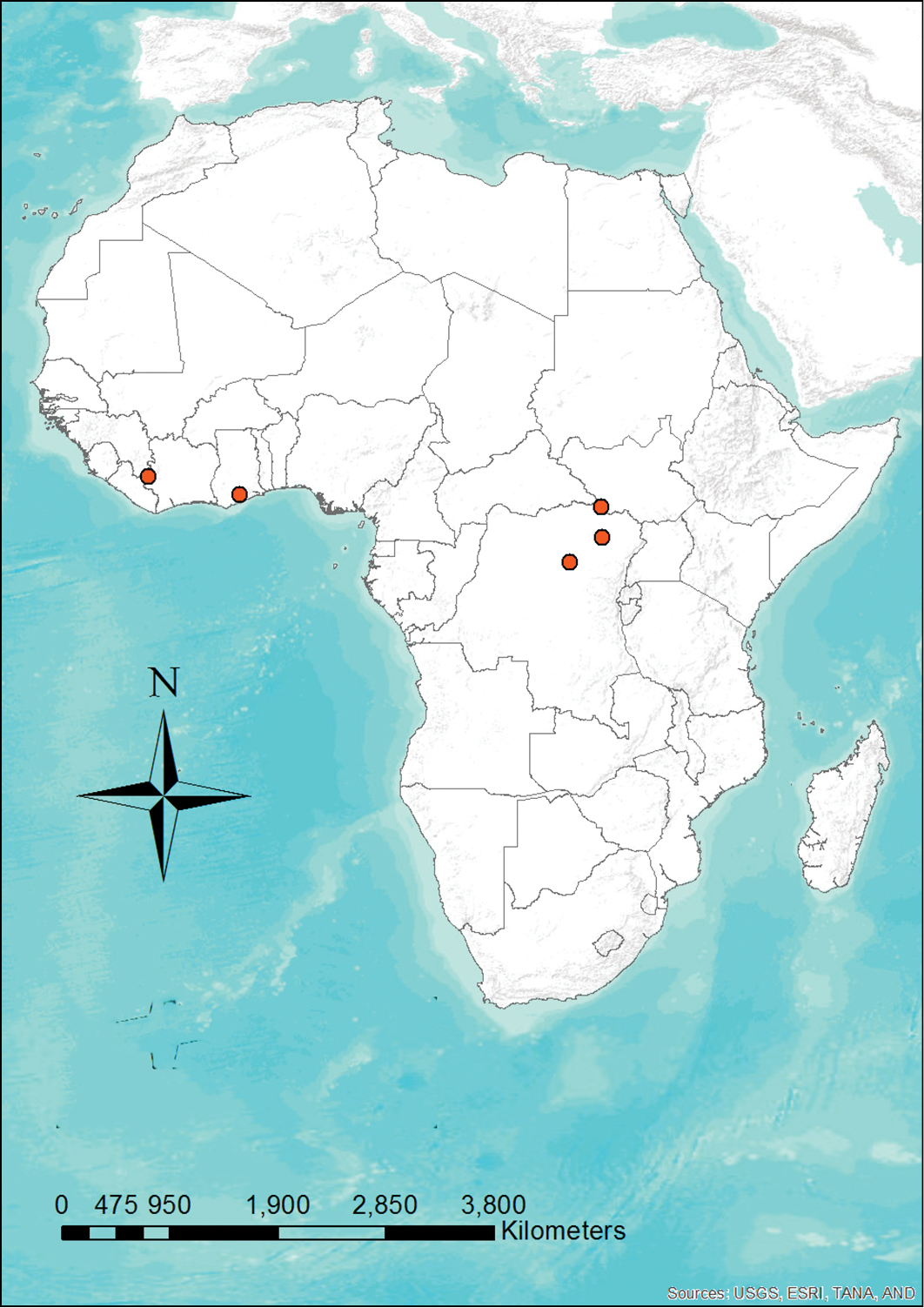

Synonyms
- Chalinolobus superbus (Honacki, Kinman, & Koeppl, 1982); Niumbaha superba (Reeder, Helgen, Vodzak, Lunde & Ejotre, 2013)

= Pied butterfly bat =

Species of bat

The pied butterfly bat (Glauconycteris superba), also known as the pied bat or badger bat, is a rare species of vesper bat in the family Vespertilionidae.

== Taxonomy ==
First discovered in 1939 in Belgian Congo, the species was, at that time, placed in the genus Glauconycteris under the name Glauconycteris superba. Following a 2013 capture in South Sudan, only the fifth recorded capture of the species, the pied bat was relocated to an entirely new genus, Niumbaha, named after the Zande word for "rare". Biology professor DeeAnn Reeder, one of the authors of the genus Niumbaha, said, "its cranial characters, its wing characters, its size, the ears – literally everything you look at doesn't fit. It's so unique that we need to create a new genus." However, recognition of Niumbaha renders Glauconycteris paraphyletic and it is incorrect to treat Niumbaha as a valid genus without further splitting of Glauconycteris. Due to this, both taxa have once again been synonymized.

== Description ==
The distinctive pied bat partly resembles a bee, with light yellow stripes and blotches on its body.

== Geographic range ==
It is found in the Democratic Republic of the Congo, Ivory Coast, Ghana, Equatorial Guinea and South Sudan. Its natural habitats are subtropical or tropical moist lowland and dry forests.
