= Slender-tailed squirrel =

Conservation status
- Near Threatened (IUCN 3.1)

Scientific classification
- Kingdom: Animalia
- Phylum: Chordata
- Class: Mammalia
- Infraclass: Placentalia
- Order: Rodentia
- Family: Sciuridae
- Genus: Protoxerus
- Species: P. aubinnii

Binomial name
- Protoxerus aubinnii (J. E. Gray, 1873)

Subspecies
- P. a. aubinnii; P. a. salae

Species of rodent

The slender-tailed squirrel (Protoxerus aubinnii) is a species of rodent in the family Sciuridae found in Ivory Coast, Ghana, Liberia, and Sierra Leone. Its natural habitat is subtropical or tropical moist lowland forests.
