= Father Basilio's striped mouse =

Conservation status
- Endangered (IUCN 3.1)

Scientific classification
- Domain: Eukaryota
- Kingdom: Animalia
- Phylum: Chordata
- Class: Mammalia
- Order: Rodentia
- Family: Muridae
- Genus: Hybomys
- Species: H. basilii

Binomial name
- Hybomys basilii Eisentraut, 1965

Species of rodent

Father Basilio's striped mouse or the Bioko hybomys (Hybomys basilii) is a species of rodent in the family Muridae. It is found only in Equatorial Guinea. Its natural habitat is subtropical or tropical moist montane forest. It is threatened by habitat loss.
