= Bibundi bat =

Conservation status
- Data Deficient (IUCN 3.1)

Scientific classification
- Kingdom: Animalia
- Phylum: Chordata
- Class: Mammalia
- Order: Chiroptera
- Family: Vespertilionidae
- Genus: Glauconycteris
- Species: G. egeria

Binomial name
- Glauconycteris egeria Thomas, 1913

Synonyms
- Chalinolobus egeria (Thomas, 1913)

Species of bat

The Bibundi bat (Glauconycteris egeria) is a species of vesper bat in the family Vespertilionidae. It can be found in Cameroon, Republic of the Congo, Uganda, and the Dzanga-Sangha Special Reserve.

== Taxonomy ==
It was described as a new species in 1913 by British zoologist Oldfield Thomas. The holotype had been collected in Bibundi, Cameroon by R. Kemp during the Rudd Exploration. Based on molecular evidence, it is closely related to the silvered bat (G. argentata).

== Description ==
Its flight membranes are brown, and it has dusky brown fur. Its fur can also be dark brown or nearly black. It has conspicuous whitish stripes on the sides of its back Its forearm length is approximately 38 mm (1.5 in). The head and body measures 43 mm (1.7 in) while the tail is 41 mm (1.6 in) long. It has very large ears, with fairly large tragi.

== Range and habitat ==
The Bibundi bat is an African species, with documented occurrence in Cameroon, the Central African Republic, and Uganda. It is rarely encountered, with records from only six localities as of 2018.

== Conservation ==
As of 2019, it is evaluated as a data deficient species by the IUCN because there is little is known about it.
