= Casinycteris =

Scientific classification
- Domain: Eukaryota
- Kingdom: Animalia
- Phylum: Chordata
- Class: Mammalia
- Order: Chiroptera
- Family: Pteropodidae
- Genus: Casinycteris; Thomas, 1910

Type species
- Casinycteris argynnis Thomas, 1910

Species
- Casinycteris argynnis Casinycteris campomaanensis Casinycteris ophiodon

Genus of bats

Casinycteris (Short-palated bat) is a genus of bats described in 1910. It currently consists of three species:

- Short-palated fruit bat (Casinycteris argynnis)
- Campo-Ma’an fruit bat (Casinycteris campomaanensis)
- Pohle's fruit bat (Casinycteris ophiodon)

Previously, the genus Casinycteris was thought to be monotypic, with only the short-palated fruit bat as a member. In 2014 however, a new species (C. campomaanensis) was described and added to the genus. In the same paper, they recommended that the Pohle's fruit bat move from Scotonycteris to Casinycteris.

Casinycteris species can be identified by the greenish skin on their snouts and eyelids and yellowish finger joints.

Casinycteris is often compared to Scotonycteris in appearance, but certain features in living Casinycteris bats such as their upturned rostrum and larger ears distinguish the genera. The genera also differ internally, with Casinycteris bats possessing a very shortened palate and a different dental structure. The similarities between the genera are attributed to their similar habitat, and differences are attributed to a dissimilar diet or feeding mechanism.
