= Machado's butterfly bat =

Conservation status
- Data Deficient (IUCN 3.1)

Scientific classification
- Kingdom: Animalia
- Phylum: Chordata
- Class: Mammalia
- Order: Chiroptera
- Family: Vespertilionidae
- Genus: Glauconycteris
- Species: G. machadoi

Binomial name
- Glauconycteris machadoi Hayman, 1963

Species of bat

Machado's butterfly bat (Glauconycteris machadoi) is a species of vesper bat in the family Vespertilionidae. It is found only in Angola. Its natural habitat is subtropical or tropical moist lowland forests.
