= Kenyan wattled bat =

Conservation status
- Data Deficient (IUCN 3.1)

Scientific classification
- Kingdom: Animalia
- Phylum: Chordata
- Class: Mammalia
- Order: Chiroptera
- Family: Vespertilionidae
- Genus: Glauconycteris
- Species: G. kenyacola

Binomial name
- Glauconycteris kenyacola Peterson, 1982

Synonyms
- Chalinolobus kenyacola (Peterson, 1982)

Species of bat

The Kenyan wattled bat (Glauconycteris kenyacola) is a species of vesper bat and a member of the family Vespertilionidae. It is found only in Kenya.
