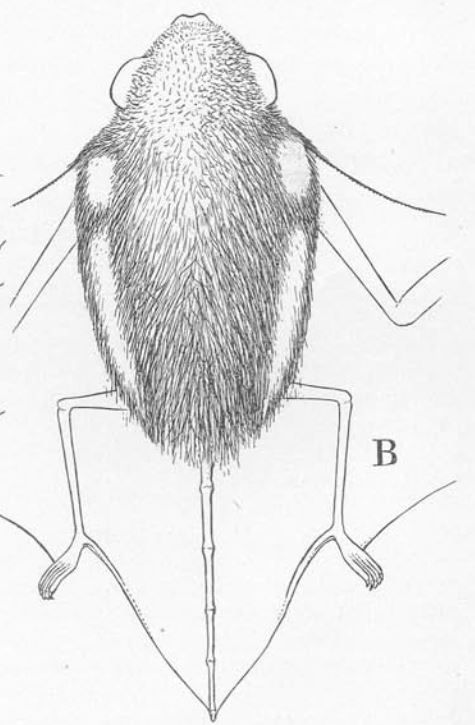

Conservation status
- Least Concern (IUCN 3.1)

Scientific classification
- Kingdom: Animalia
- Phylum: Chordata
- Class: Mammalia
- Order: Chiroptera
- Family: Vespertilionidae
- Genus: Glauconycteris
- Species: G. alboguttata

Binomial name
- Glauconycteris alboguttata J.A. Allen, 1917

Synonyms
- Chalinolobus alboguttatus (J.A. Allen, 1917)

= Allen's striped bat =

Species of bat

Allen's striped bat (Glauconycteris alboguttata) is a species of bat in the family Vespertilionidae, the vesper bats. It is native to Africa, where it occurs in Cameroon and the Democratic Republic of the Congo. This species can be found in lowland tropical moist forests. Little else is known about it.

== Taxonomy and etymology ==
It was described in 1917 by American mammalogist Joel Asaph Allen. The holotype used to describe the species had been collected by Herbert Lang and James Chapin. Chapin and Lang first encountered the species in Medje, Democratic Republic of the Congo. Its species name "alboguttata" is from Latin "albus" meaning "white" and "guttate" meaning "spotted", likely referring to its white patches of fur.

== Description ==
From head to tail, it is 94 mm (3.7 in) long. Its forearm is approximately 41.5 mm (1.63 in) long. Unlike Allen's spotted bat, which is similar in appearance, it does have a calcar. Its fur is seal brown, with dorsal fur darker than the ventral fur. On each side of its back, it has two white patches of fur, for a total of four white spots. Each shoulder has a white spot, and there is a long, narrow stripe beneath each shoulder spot. Its propatagium is whitish, as well as the borders of its wings. The rest of the flight membranes and its ears are blackish brown.

== Range and status ==
It has been documented in both Cameroon and the Democratic Republic of the Congo. However, its range may be larger than currently known, as it is a poorly-documented species. It is currently evaluated as least concern by the IUCN—its lowest conservation priority. While it is considered a rare species, it has a relatively large range and its population is likely large.
