= Temminck's striped mouse =

Conservation status
- Least Concern (IUCN 3.1)

Scientific classification
- Kingdom: Animalia
- Phylum: Chordata
- Class: Mammalia
- Order: Rodentia
- Family: Muridae
- Genus: Hybomys
- Species: H. trivirgatus

Binomial name
- Hybomys trivirgatus (Temminck, 1853)

Species of rodent

Temminck's striped mouse or West African hybomys (Hybomys trivirgatus) is a species of rodent in the family Muridae. It is found in Ivory Coast, Ghana, Guinea, Liberia, Nigeria, and Sierra Leone. Its natural habitat is subtropical or tropical moist lowland forest. It is threatened by habitat loss.
