= Moon striped mouse =

Conservation status
- Vulnerable (IUCN 3.1)

Scientific classification
- Kingdom: Animalia
- Phylum: Chordata
- Class: Mammalia
- Order: Rodentia
- Family: Muridae
- Genus: Hybomys
- Species: H. lunaris

Binomial name
- Hybomys lunaris (Thomas, 1906)

Species of rodent

The moon striped mouse or Ruwenzori hybomys (Hybomys lunaris) is a species of rodent in the family Muridae. It is found in Democratic Republic of the Congo, Rwanda, and Uganda. Its natural habitat is subtropical or tropical moist montane forests. It is threatened by habitat loss.

== Description ==
The moon striped mouse ranges from 10 to 16 centimeters (3.9 to 6.3 inches) in body length, with a tail length of 7–13.5 centimeters (2.8–5.3 inches). It weighs 30–70 g (1.1–2.5 oz).

== Diet ==
The moon striped mouse feeds on a wide array of food, including insects, fruits, and seeds.

== Reproduction ==
The moon striped mouse has a gestation period of 28–29 days, and gives birth to 2-3 young.
