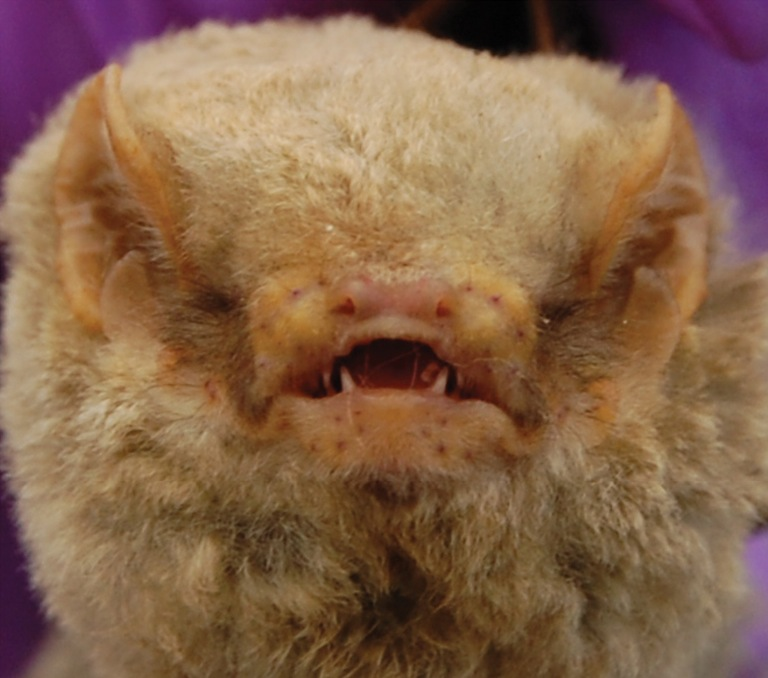
- Abo bat (Glauconycteris poensis)

Scientific classification
- Kingdom: Animalia
- Phylum: Chordata
- Class: Mammalia
- Order: Chiroptera
- Family: Vespertilionidae
- Tribe: Eptesicini
- Genus: Glauconycteris; Dobson, 1875

Type species
- Kerivoula poensis Gray, 1842

Species
- See text

= Glauconycteris =

Genus of bats

Glauconycteris is a genus of vespertilionid bats found in Africa.

== Species ==
Glauconycteris alboguttata - Allen's striped bat
Glauconycteris argentata - silvered bat
Glauconycteris atra - blackish butterfly bat
Glauconycteris beatrix - Beatrix's bat
Glauconycteris curryae - Curry's bat
Glauconycteris egeria - Bibundi bat
Glauconycteris gleni - Glen's wattled bat
Glauconycteris humeralis - Allen's spotted bat
Glauconycteris kenyacola - Kenyan wattled bat
Glauconycteris machadoi - Machado's butterfly bat
Glauconycteris poensis - Abo bat
Glauconycteris superba - pied butterfly bat
Glauconycteris variegata - variegated butterfly bat
