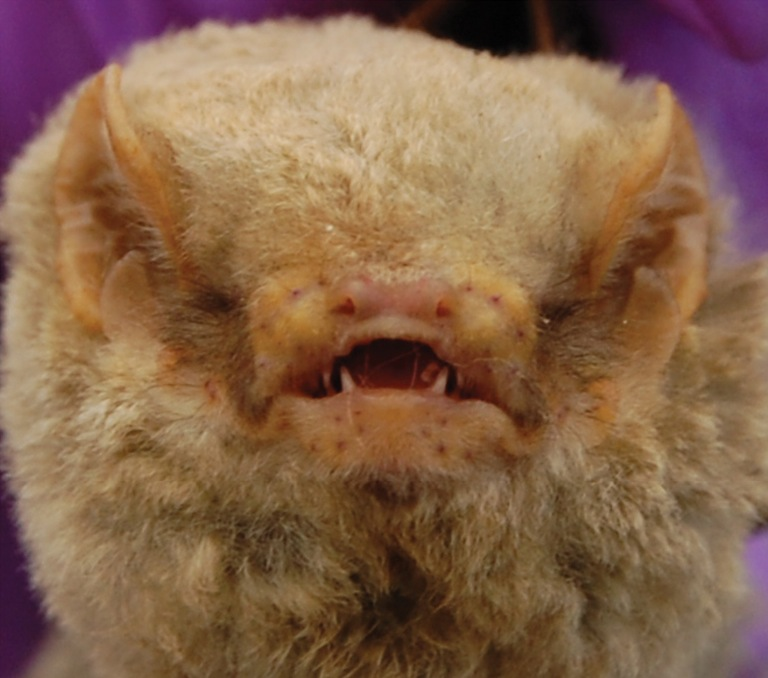

Conservation status
- Least Concern (IUCN 3.1)

Scientific classification
- Kingdom: Animalia
- Phylum: Chordata
- Class: Mammalia
- Order: Chiroptera
- Family: Vespertilionidae
- Genus: Glauconycteris
- Species: G. poensis

Binomial name
- Glauconycteris poensis (Gray, 1842)

Synonyms
- Chalinolobus poensis Gray, 1842; Kerivoula poensis Gray, 1842

= Abo bat =

Species of bat

The Abo bat (Glauconycteris poensis) is a species of vesper bat in the family Vespertilionidae. It is found in several countries in West Africa and Central Africa. It is found in subtropical and tropical dry and moist lowland forests.

== Taxonomy and etymology ==
It was described as a new species in 1842 by British zoologist John Edward Gray. Gray placed the species into a new genus, Kerivoula, with the scientific name Kerivoula poensis. Its species name "poensis" means "belonging to Po." The holotype was collected on Fernando Pó, likely inspiring the species name.

== Description ==
Its fur is yellowish-gray in color.

== Range and status ==
It is found in Benin, Cameroon, Democratic Republic of the Congo, Côte d'Ivoire, Equatorial Guinea, Ghana, Guinea, Liberia, Nigeria, Senegal, Sierra Leone, and Togo.

It is currently evaluated as least concern by the IUCN—its lowest conservation priority.
