= Peters's striped mouse =

Conservation status
- Least Concern (IUCN 3.1)

Scientific classification
- Kingdom: Animalia
- Phylum: Chordata
- Class: Mammalia
- Order: Rodentia
- Family: Muridae
- Genus: Hybomys
- Species: H. univittatus

Binomial name
- Hybomys univittatus (Peters, 1876)

Species of rodent

Peters's striped mouse or Peters's hybomys (Hybomys univittatus) is a species of rodent in the family Muridae. It is found in Angola, Burundi, Cameroon, Central African Republic, Republic of the Congo, Democratic Republic of the Congo, Equatorial Guinea, Gabon, Nigeria, Rwanda, Uganda, and Zambia. Its natural habitats are subtropical or tropical dry forest, subtropical or tropical moist lowland forest, and subtropical or tropical moist montane forest.
