= Curry's bat =

Conservation status
- Data Deficient (IUCN 3.1)

Scientific classification
- Kingdom: Animalia
- Phylum: Chordata
- Class: Mammalia
- Order: Chiroptera
- Family: Vespertilionidae
- Genus: Glauconycteris
- Species: G. curryae

Binomial name
- Glauconycteris curryae Eger & Schlitter, 2001

Species of bat

Curry's bat (Glauconycteris curryae) is a species of vesper bat in the family Vespertilionidae. It is found in Cameroon and Democratic Republic of the Congo. Its natural habitats are subtropical and tropical moist lowland forests and subtropical and tropical swamps.

The specific name was originally curryi, but it was emended to be curryae in accordance with §31.1.2 of the ICZN Code.
