= Eisentraut's striped mouse =

Conservation status
- Endangered (IUCN 3.1)

Scientific classification
- Kingdom: Animalia
- Phylum: Chordata
- Class: Mammalia
- Order: Rodentia
- Family: Muridae
- Genus: Hybomys
- Species: H. badius

Binomial name
- Hybomys badius Osgood, 1936

Synonyms
- eisentrauti Van der Straeten & Hutterer, 1986

Species of rodent

Eisentraut's striped mouse or Eisentraut's hybomys (Hybomys badius) is a species of rodent in the family Muridae. It is found only in Cameroon. Its natural habitat is subtropical or tropical moist montane forests. It is threatened by habitat loss.
