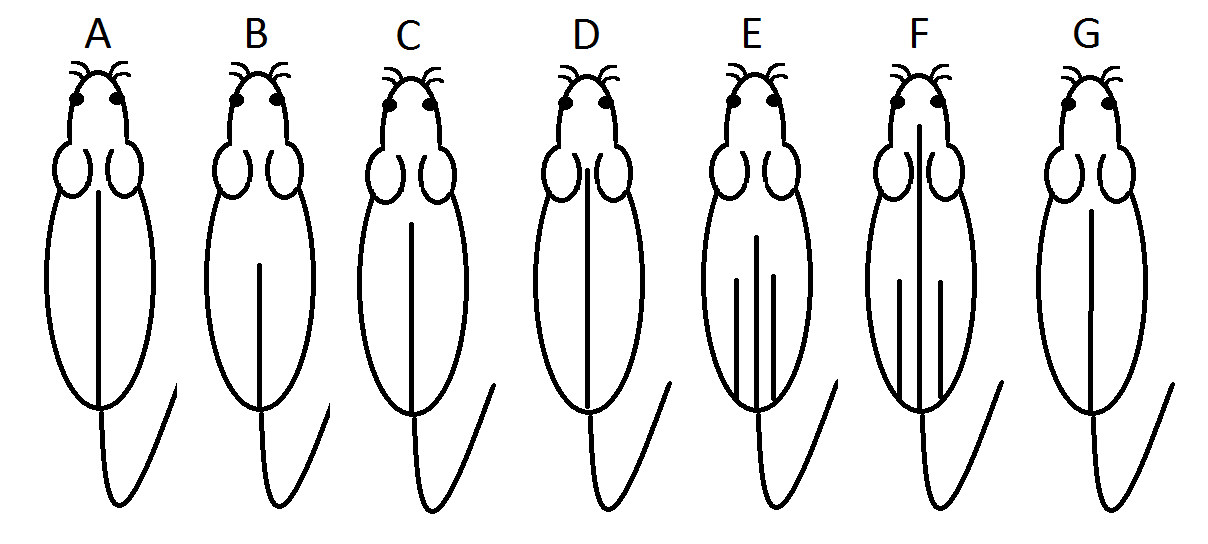

Scientific classification
- Domain: Eukaryota
- Kingdom: Animalia
- Phylum: Chordata
- Class: Mammalia
- Order: Rodentia
- Family: Muridae
- Subfamily: Murinae
- Tribe: Arvicanthini
- Genus: Hybomys; Thomas, 1910

Type species
- Mus univittatus

Species
- Hybomys badius Hybomys basilii Hybomys lunaris Hybomys planifrons Hybomys trivirgatus Hybomys univittatus

= Hybomys =

Genus of rodents

Hybomys is a genus of rodent in the family Muridae endemic to Africa. It contains the following species:

- Eisentraut's striped mouse (Hybomys badius)
- Father Basilio's striped mouse (Hybomys basilii)
- Moon striped mouse (Hybomys lunaris)
- Miller's striped mouse (Hybomys planifrons)
- Temminck's striped mouse (Hybomys trivirgatus)
- Peters's striped mouse (Hybomys univittatus)
