= Glen's wattled bat =

Conservation status
- Data Deficient (IUCN 3.1)

Scientific classification
- Kingdom: Animalia
- Phylum: Chordata
- Class: Mammalia
- Order: Chiroptera
- Family: Vespertilionidae
- Genus: Glauconycteris
- Species: G. gleni

Binomial name
- Glauconycteris gleni Peterson & Smith, 1973

Synonyms
- Chalinolobus gleni (Peterson & Smith, 1973)

Species of bat

Glen's wattled bat (Glauconycteris gleni) is a species of vesper bat in the family Vespertilionidae. It is found in Cameroon and Uganda. Its natural habitat is subtropical or tropical moist lowland forests. Little is known about the ecology of this bat. The species was first described by Robert Glen in 1973.
