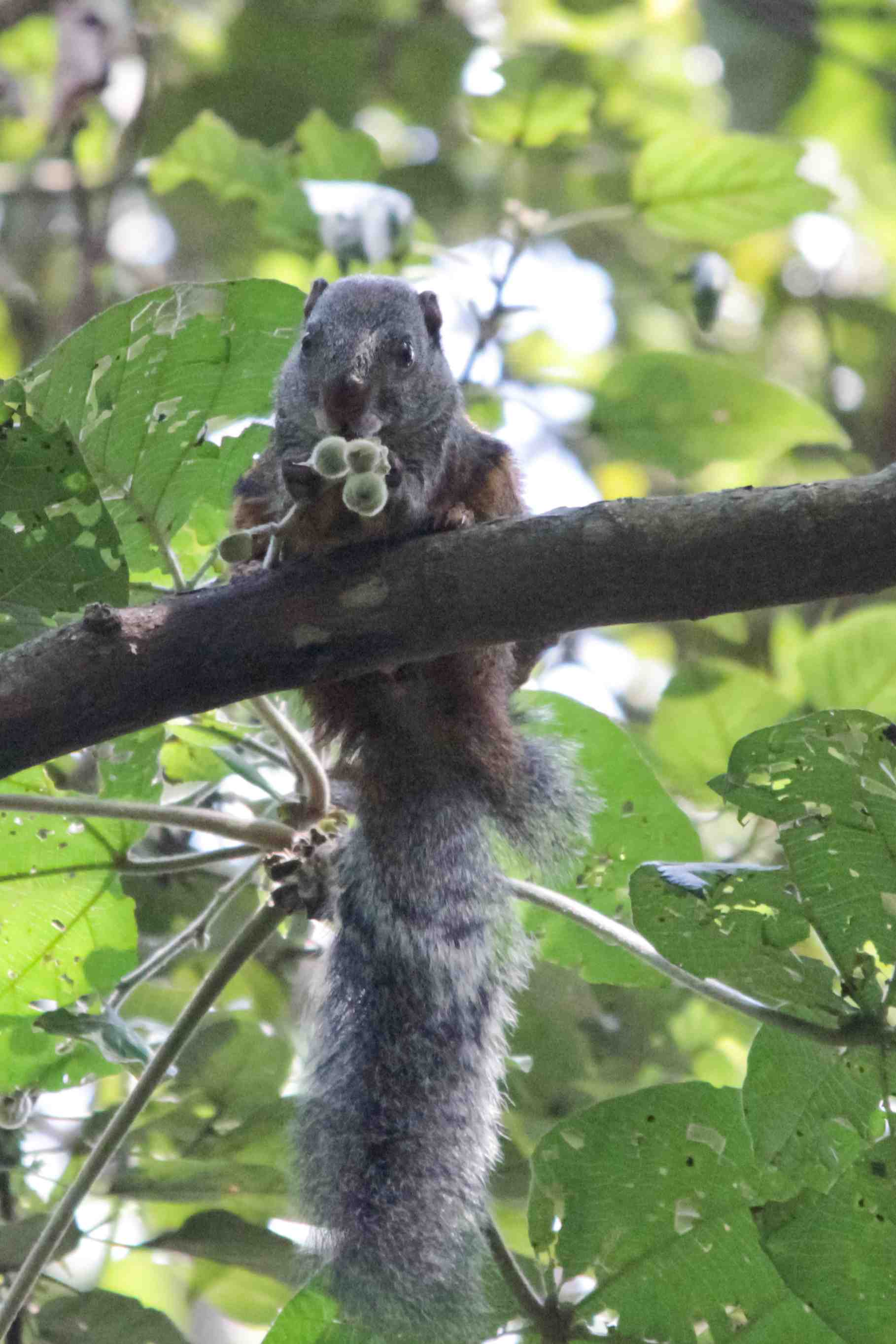
- Forest giant squirrel (Protoxerus stangeri)

Scientific classification
- Domain: Eukaryota
- Kingdom: Animalia
- Phylum: Chordata
- Class: Mammalia
- Order: Rodentia
- Family: Sciuridae
- Tribe: Protoxerini
- Genus: Protoxerus; Forsyth Major, 1893

Type species
- Sciurus stangeri Waterhouse, 1842

Species
- Protoxerus stangeri Protoxerus aubinnii

= African giant squirrel =

Genus of rodents

African giant squirrels (genus Protoxerus) form a taxon of squirrels under the subfamily Xerinae. They are only found in Africa.

The two subgenera of African giant squirrels each has a single species:

- Subgenus Protoxerus - forest giant squirrel or Stanger's squirrel, P. stangeri
- Subgenus Allosciurus - slender-tailed squirrel, P. aubinnii
