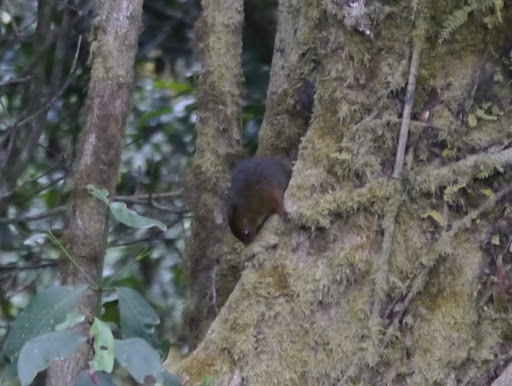
- Coopers Mountain Squirrel

Conservation status
- Data Deficient (IUCN 3.1)

Scientific classification
- Kingdom: Animalia
- Phylum: Chordata
- Class: Mammalia
- Order: Rodentia
- Family: Sciuridae
- Genus: Paraxerus
- Species: P. cooperi

Binomial name
- Paraxerus cooperi (Hayman, 1950)

= Cooper's mountain squirrel =

Species of rodent

Cooper's mountain squirrel (Paraxerus cooperi) is a species of rodent in the family Sciuridae found in Cameroon and Nigeria. Its natural habitat is subtropical or tropical moist montane forests.
