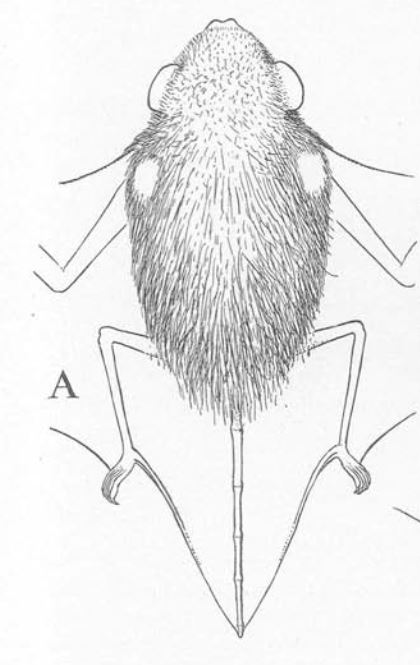

Conservation status
- Data Deficient (IUCN 3.1)

Scientific classification
- Kingdom: Animalia
- Phylum: Chordata
- Class: Mammalia
- Order: Chiroptera
- Family: Vespertilionidae
- Genus: Glauconycteris
- Species: G. humeralis

Binomial name
- Glauconycteris humeralis J.A. Allen, 1917

= Allen's spotted bat =

Species of bat

Allen's spotted bat (Glauconycteris humeralis) is a species of vesper bat in the family Vespertilionidae found in the Central African Republic, the Democratic Republic of the Congo, Kenya, and Uganda. It is found in subtropical or tropical moist lowland forests.

== Taxonomy and etymology ==
It was described in 1917 by American mammalogist Joel Asaph Allen. The holotype used to describe the species had been collected by Herbert Lang and James Chapin. Chapin and Lang first encountered the species in Medje, Democratic Republic of the Congo. Its species name "humeralis" is Latin for "having a cape," possibly referring to its white shoulder patches.

== Description ==
It has "conspicuous" tufts of white fur on each of its shoulders. Its fur is brown, with the dorsal fur darker than the ventral fur. Its flight membranes are also brown. It lacks a calcar. It has small, yellowish-brown ears and a short tragus. The inner margin of the tragus is straight, while the outer margin is convex. The tail does not extend beyond the uropatagium. Its total length, including its tail, is approximately 82 mm (3.2 in). The forearm is 35.3–36.8 mm (1.39–1.45 in) long. Its skull is very broad and short.

== Range and habitat ==
It has been documented in Uganda as well as eastern Democratic Republic of the Congo. Its range possibly includes Kenya as well. It is found in association with lowland tropical moist forests.

== Conservation ==
It is currently evaluated as data deficient by the IUCN. Little is known about its range or natural history but threats to its survival may include deforestation caused by logging and mining. It is possibly threatened by habitat conversion to farmland.
