= Robert William Hayman =

- Born: 1905
- Died: 1985 (aged 79–80)
- Known for: Research on African bats; taxonomic classification of mammals
- Scientific career
- Fields: Zoology
- Workplaces: Natural History Museum, London

Robert William Hayman (1905 – 1985) was a British zoologist.

== Biography ==
Hayman served as the head of the Mammal Section at the Natural History Museum, London from 1921 to 1968. He published several significant works on African bats and identified a number of mammal genera and species, contributing to the advancement of mammalian taxonomy.

== Taxa described ==
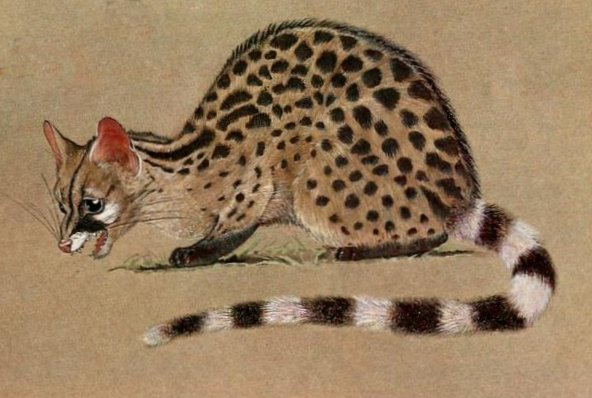
Genetta cristata

- Delanymys brooksi
- Glauconycteris machadoi
- Hipposideros jonesi
- Liberiictis kuhni
- Micropteropus intermedius
- Neopteryx frosti
- Otomops secundus
- Paraxerus cooperi
- Paraxerus vincenti
- Pelomys hopkinsi
- Rhinopoma macinnesi
- Steatomys jacksoni

== Species named in his honour ==
- Dendromus haymani (Hatt, 1934)

== Selected publications ==
- Hayman et al. (1966). The bats of the Congo and of Rwanda and Burundi. Annales du Musée Royal de l’Afrique Centrale, Tervuren, Belgium, No. 154.
- Hayman and Hill (1971). Order Chiroptera. In The Mammals of Africa: An Identification Manual. Smithsonian Institution, Washington, D.C.
