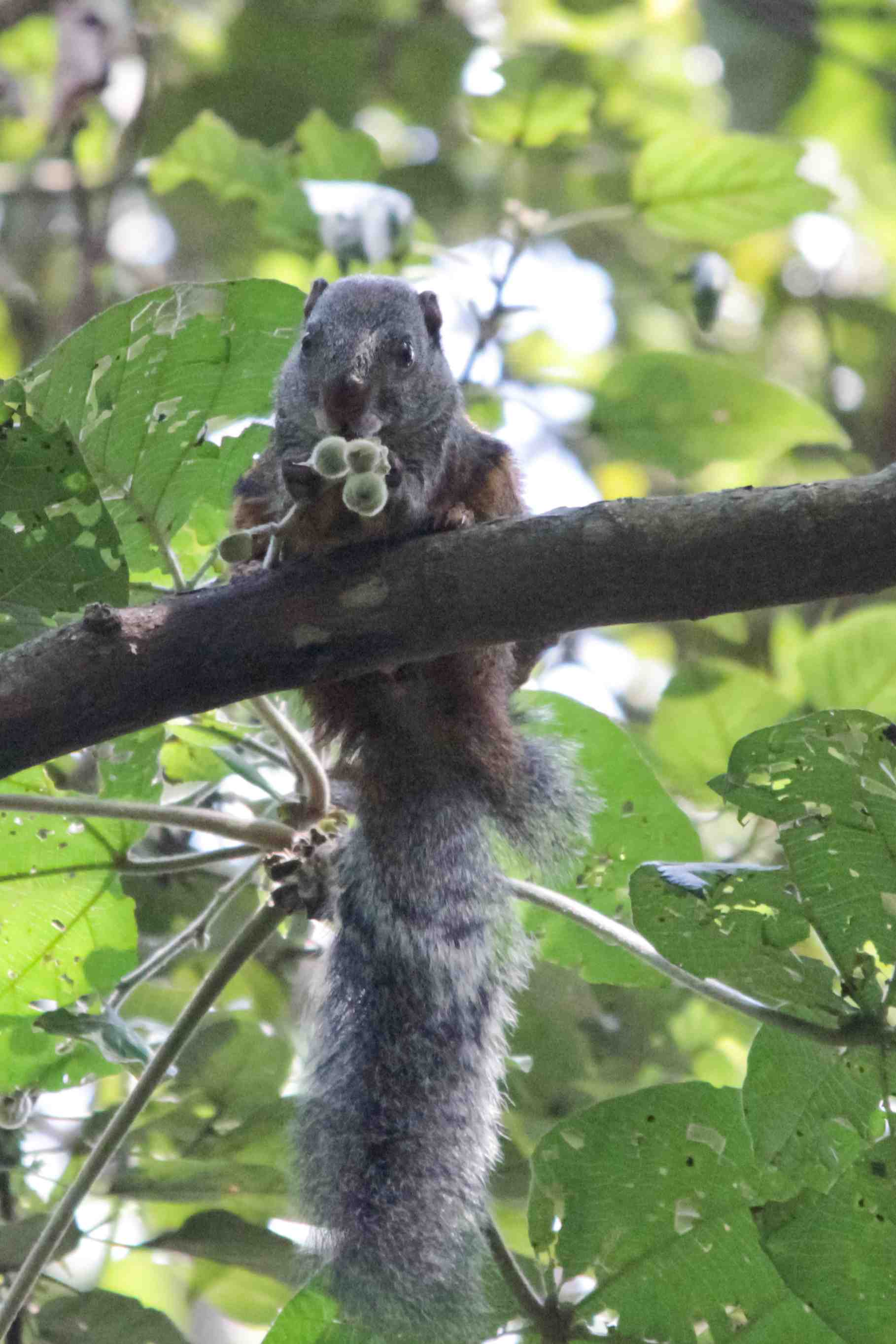
- South Nandi Forest, Kenya

Conservation status
- Least Concern (IUCN 3.1)

Scientific classification
- Kingdom: Animalia
- Phylum: Chordata
- Class: Mammalia
- Infraclass: Placentalia
- Order: Rodentia
- Family: Sciuridae
- Genus: Protoxerus
- Species: P. stangeri

Binomial name
- Protoxerus stangeri (Waterhouse, 1842)

Subspecies
- P. s. stangeri; P. s. bea; P. s. centricola; P. s. cooperi; P. s. eborivorus; P. s. kabobo; P. s. kwango; P. s. loandae; P. s. nigeriae; P. s. personatus; P. s. signatus; P. s. temminckii

= Forest giant squirrel =

Species of rodent

The forest giant squirrel (Protoxerus stangeri) or Stanger's squirrel is a species of rodent in the family Sciuridae found in Angola, Benin, Burundi, Cameroon, the Central African Republic, the Republic of the Congo, the Democratic Republic of the Congo, Ivory Coast, Equatorial Guinea, Gabon, Ghana, Kenya, Liberia, Nigeria, Rwanda, Sierra Leone, Tanzania, Togo, and Uganda. Its natural habitats are subtropical or tropical moist lowland forests and plantations.

== Description ==
The forest giant squirrel is the largest arboreal squirrel in Africa with a head-and-body length of around 300 mm (12 in) and a bushy tail of a similar length. The head is large and rounded with powerful cheek muscles. The brownish hairs on the top of the head and on the nape are tipped with white giving a frosted appearance. The ears are small, rounded and almost hairless. The body colouring is rather variable across the animal's wide range. The fur is short and stiff; the upper parts are medium brown grizzled with buff or yellow, the individual hairs having black bases, yellow or buff shafts and black tips. The chest is white and the underparts are almost hairless showing the yellowish skin. The limbs are compact and strong. The tail is long and bushy and the black and white barring is sometimes not clearly visible. When the animal is moving around, the tail is held horizontally, but when it is stationary, the tail hangs down.

== Distribution and habitat ==
The forest giant squirrel is native to tropical western and central Africa. Its range extends from Sierra Leone to western Kenya, and southwards to northern Angola and northern Tanzania. It is a lowland species with a maximum altitudinal limit of about 2,000 m (6,600 ft). It occurs in primary forest, secondary forest and fringing forest as well as plantations and agricultural land and gardens with trees. It is normally found in the upper layers of the canopy, only occasionally descending to ground level.

== Ecology ==
The forest giant squirrel is solitary and diurnal. It forages primarily for the fruits and seeds of trees and lianas; it can crack open the tough nuts of Panda oleosa, Coula edulis, Klainedoxa gabonensis, Elaeis, and Irvingia spp.. The diet also includes some other plant material and a very small proportion of insects. The squirrel has a home range of a few hectares and seems to avoid other squirrels or drive them away from a tree where it is feeding. Vocalisations include two types of alarm calls. This squirrel is preyed on by eagles and other large birds of prey.

The nest is made in a tree cavity with an entrance through which the squirrel can just fit. Nesting material consists of twigs with the green leaves still attached. The squirrel emerges around dawn and returns to the nest many hours later. The reproductive behaviour of this squirrel has not been studied but it usually has litters of one or two young.

The upper side of the tail has broad transverse bars of black and narrow bars of white while the underside has equal-sized longitudinal stripes in black and white. The tail is used for signalling, and when displayed upwards the signal differs from when it is displayed downwards.

== Status ==
The forest giant squirrel is generally not a common species. In some parts of its range it is hunted for bushmeat but in general does not seem to face any particular threats. Habitat destruction is occurring in parts of its range but it seems able to adapt to man-made habitats to some extent and the International Union for Conservation of Nature has assessed its conservation status as being of "least concern".

Twelve subspecies are recognized.
