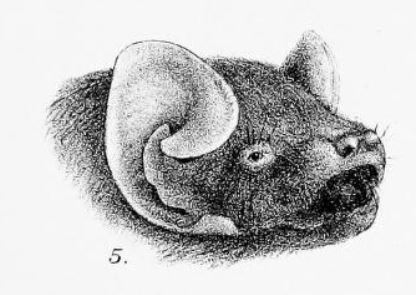

Conservation status
- Least Concern (IUCN 3.1)

Scientific classification
- Kingdom: Animalia
- Phylum: Chordata
- Class: Mammalia
- Order: Chiroptera
- Family: Vespertilionidae
- Genus: Glauconycteris
- Species: G. argentata

Binomial name
- Glauconycteris argentata (Dobson, 1875)

Synonyms
- Chalinolobus argentatus (Dobson, 1875)

= Silvered bat =

Species of bat

The silvered bat (Glauconycteris argentata) is a species of vesper bat in the family Vespertilionidae. It is found in Angola, Burundi, Cameroon, Republic of the Congo, Democratic Republic of the Congo, Equatorial Guinea, Kenya, Malawi, Rwanda, and Tanzania. Its natural habitats are subtropical or tropical moist lowland forests and moist savanna.
