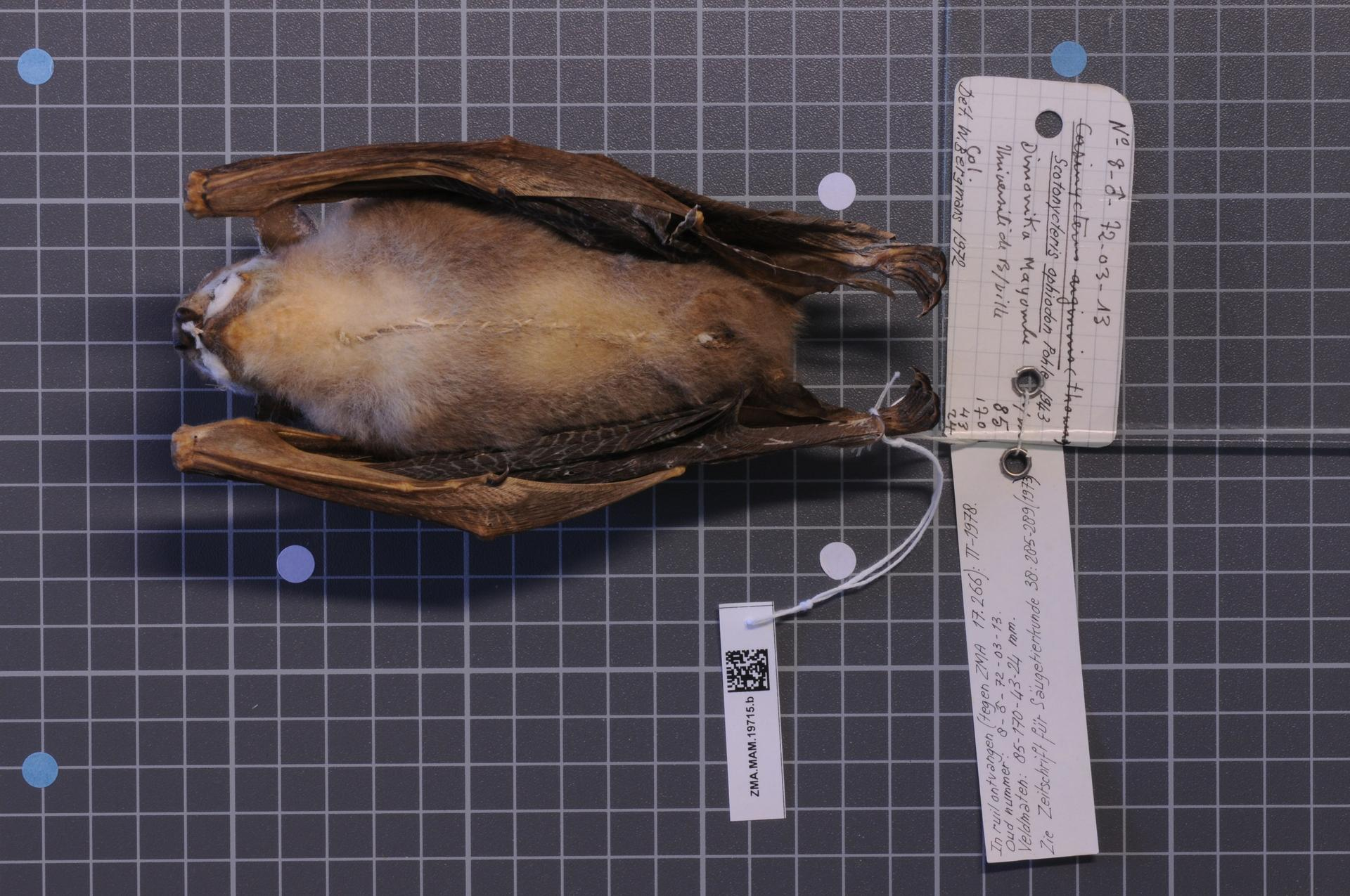

Conservation status
- Near Threatened (IUCN 3.1)

Scientific classification
- Kingdom: Animalia
- Phylum: Chordata
- Class: Mammalia
- Order: Chiroptera
- Family: Pteropodidae
- Genus: Casinycteris
- Species: C. ophiodon

Binomial name
- Casinycteris ophiodon Pohle, 1943
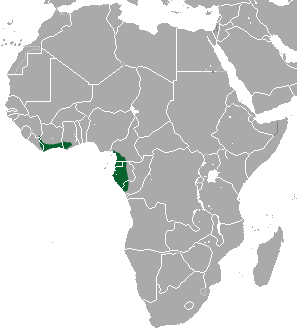
- Pohle's fruit bat range

= Pohle's fruit bat =

Species of bat

Pohle's fruit bat (Casinycteris ophiodon) is a near threatened species of megabat found in the subtropical and tropical forests of Cameroon, the Republic of Congo, Côte d'Ivoire, Ghana, and Liberia.

== Taxonomy ==
In 2014, its taxonomy was revised. While it was previously in the genus Scotonycteris, analysis of mitochondrial DNA showed that it should be placed in Casinycteris to avoid paraphyly of Scotonycteris.

== Description ==
Pohle's fruit bats are also known as 'tear-drop' fruit bats because of the prominent tear-like white spots found on both sides of their eyes and on their upper lips. Their fur is tinted and the wings are dark brown. They measure 74-78 millimeters and weigh between 35 and 60 grams.

They live in the lowland forests of West and Central Africa, mostly in the lowest level of undergrowth, where they feed on various fruits and flowers. The main threats to the species' habitat include agriculture, mining, logging, and other human disturbances such as fire. There are established policy-based legislation actions as well as habitat and site-based action in protected areas.
