= Livingstone's yellow bat =

Conservation status
- Least Concern (IUCN 3.1)

Scientific classification
- Domain: Eukaryota
- Kingdom: Animalia
- Phylum: Chordata
- Class: Mammalia
- Order: Chiroptera
- Family: Vespertilionidae
- Genus: Scotophilus
- Species: S. livingstonii

Binomial name
- Scotophilus livingstonii Brooks & Bickham, 2014

Species of mammal

Livingstone's yellow bat or Livingstone's house bat (Scotophilus livingstonii) is a species of bat found in Africa.

== Taxonomy and etymology ==
It was described as a new species in 2014. The holotype was collected in 1985 in Kenya. It is a sister taxon to the African yellow bat (S. dinganii) and Scotophilus trujilloi. The eponym for the species name "livingstonii" is Scottish explorer David Livingstone.

== Description ==
It is a small species of bat, with a head and body length of 85.4 mm (3.36 in) and a tail length of 48.4 mm (1.91 in). The forearm is approximately 51.7–55.6 mm (2.04–2.19 in) long. Its fur is reddish-mahogany in color.

== Range and status ==
It has been documented in Ghana and Kenya. As Ghana and Kenya are on opposite sides of the continent, it is likely that its range includes some of the countries between.

As of 2017 it is evaluated as a least-concern species by the IUCN. It is threatened by intentional destruction of its roosts by humans.
