= S. celebensis =

S. celebensis may refer to:

- Scotophilus celebensis, the Sulawesi yellow bat, a vesper bat species
- Strigocuscus celebensis, the Sulawesi dwarf cuscus, a marsupial species
