= Sulawesi yellow bat =

Conservation status
- Data Deficient (IUCN 3.1)

Scientific classification
- Kingdom: Animalia
- Phylum: Chordata
- Class: Mammalia
- Order: Chiroptera
- Family: Vespertilionidae
- Genus: Scotophilus
- Species: S. celebensis

Binomial name
- Scotophilus celebensis (Sody, 1928)

Synonyms
- Pachyotis temmincki celebensis

Species of bat

The Sulawesi yellow bat (Scotophilus celebensis) is a species of vesper bat. It is found only in Indonesia.

== Taaxonomy ==
The Sulawesi yellow bat was described by Dutch mammalogist Henry Jacob Victor Sody in 1928. He placed it in the now-defunct genus Pachyotis as a subspecies of Pachyotis temmincki, which is now recognized as a synonymm for Scotophilus kuhlii (Lesser Asiatic yellow bat). The holotype had been collected in Sulawesi.

Later authors have argued that Scotophilus celebensis is synonymous with Scotophilus heathii, the Greater Asiatic yellow bat.

== Range and habitat ==
The Sulawesi yellow bat is endemic to Indonesia, where it is only known from the island of Sulawesi. It likely uses forest habitat, and may roost in houses during the day.
