= Andrew Rebori's house bat =

Conservation status
- Least Concern (IUCN 3.1)

Scientific classification
- Domain: Eukaryota
- Kingdom: Animalia
- Phylum: Chordata
- Class: Mammalia
- Order: Chiroptera
- Family: Vespertilionidae
- Genus: Scotophilus
- Species: S. andrewreborii

Binomial name
- Scotophilus andrewreborii Brooks & Bickham, 2014
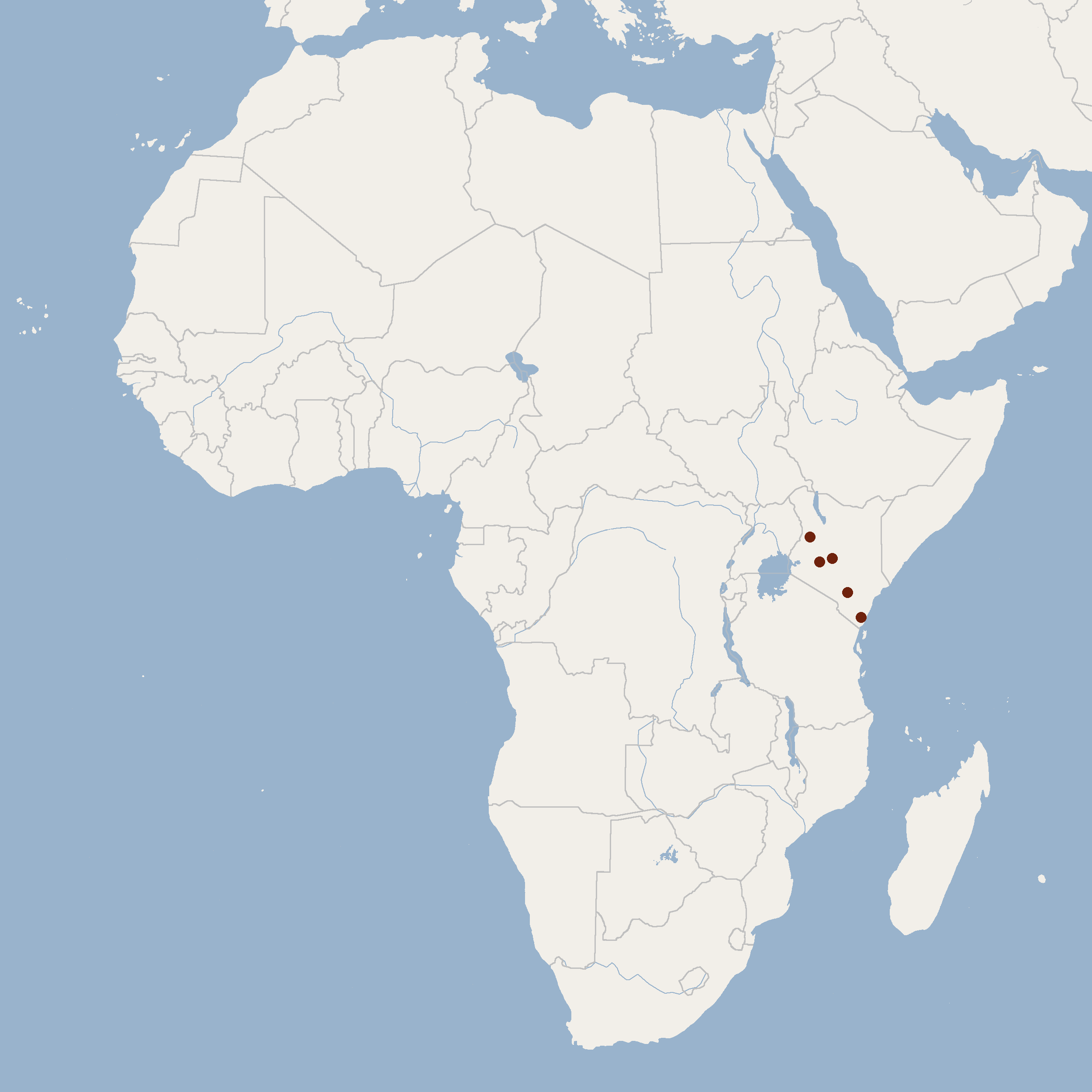

Species of bat

Andrew Rebori's house bat (Scotophilus andrewreborii) is a species of bat found in Africa.

== Taxonomy and etymology ==
It was described as a new species in 2014. The eponym for the species name "andrewreborii" is Andrew N. Rebori (1948–2011), who "maintained a key interest in animals, especially bats." The IUCN has questioned whether "andrewreborii" is the correct species name for this taxa, given the nomenclature rule known as the Principle of Priority. The IUCN has stated that the correct name for this species may be Scotophilus colias, if using the Principle of Priority.

== Description ==
The fur of its back is reddish or mahogany in color. Its ventral fur is tan to orange, with the chin and sides of body darker in color. Its forearm is 46.5–54.1 mm (1.83–2.13 in).

== Conservation ==
It is currently evaluated as least concern by the IUCN. It meets the criteria for this classification because it has a wide geographic range, its range includes protected areas, and it tolerates human-altered landscapes.
