= Ejeta's yellow bat =

Ejeta’s yellow bat

Conservation status
- Least Concern (IUCN 3.1)

Scientific classification
- Kingdom: Animalia
- Phylum: Chordata
- Class: Mammalia
- Order: Chiroptera
- Family: Vespertilionidae
- Genus: Scotophilus
- Species: S. ejetai

Binomial name
- Scotophilus ejetai Brooks & Bickham, 2014
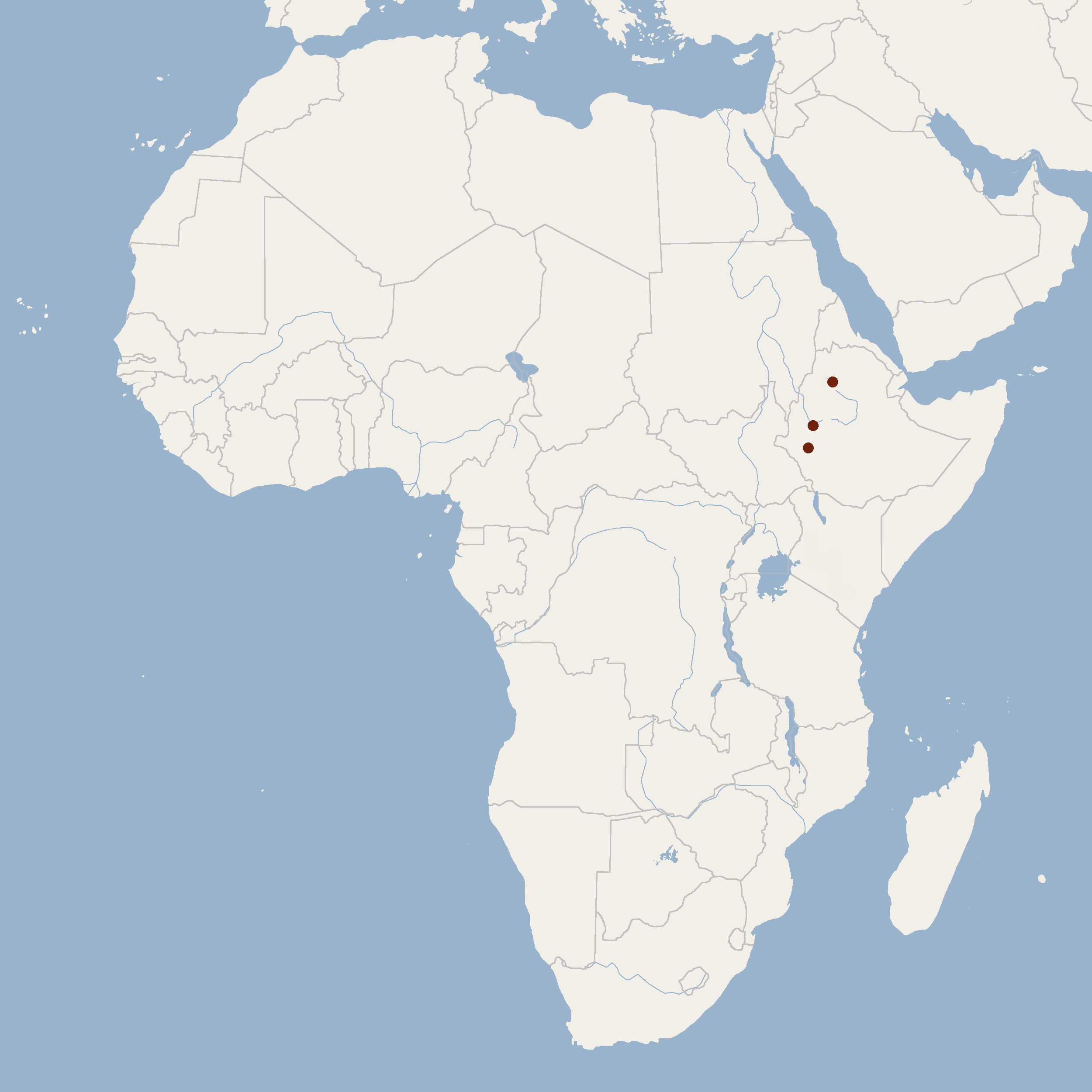

Species of bat

Ejeta's yellow bat or Ejeta's house bat (Scotophilus ejetai) is a species of vesper bat endemic to in Ethiopia. It was described as a new species of bat in 2014.

== Taxonomy and etymology ==
It was described as a new species in 2014. The eponym for the species name "ejetai" is Ethiopian-American scientist Gebisa Ejeta. Ejeta was honored with the species name because the holotype was collected from Ethiopia, and "the results of [Ejeta's] work have dramatically enhanced the food supply of hundreds of millions of people in sub-Saharan Africa."

== Description ==
Its forearm length is approximately 50 mm (2.0 in). The fur on its dorsal surface is a reddish mahogany color, while the fur on its ventral surface is orange with a grayish tint towards its posterior.

== Conservation ==
It is currently assessed as least concern by the IUCN.
