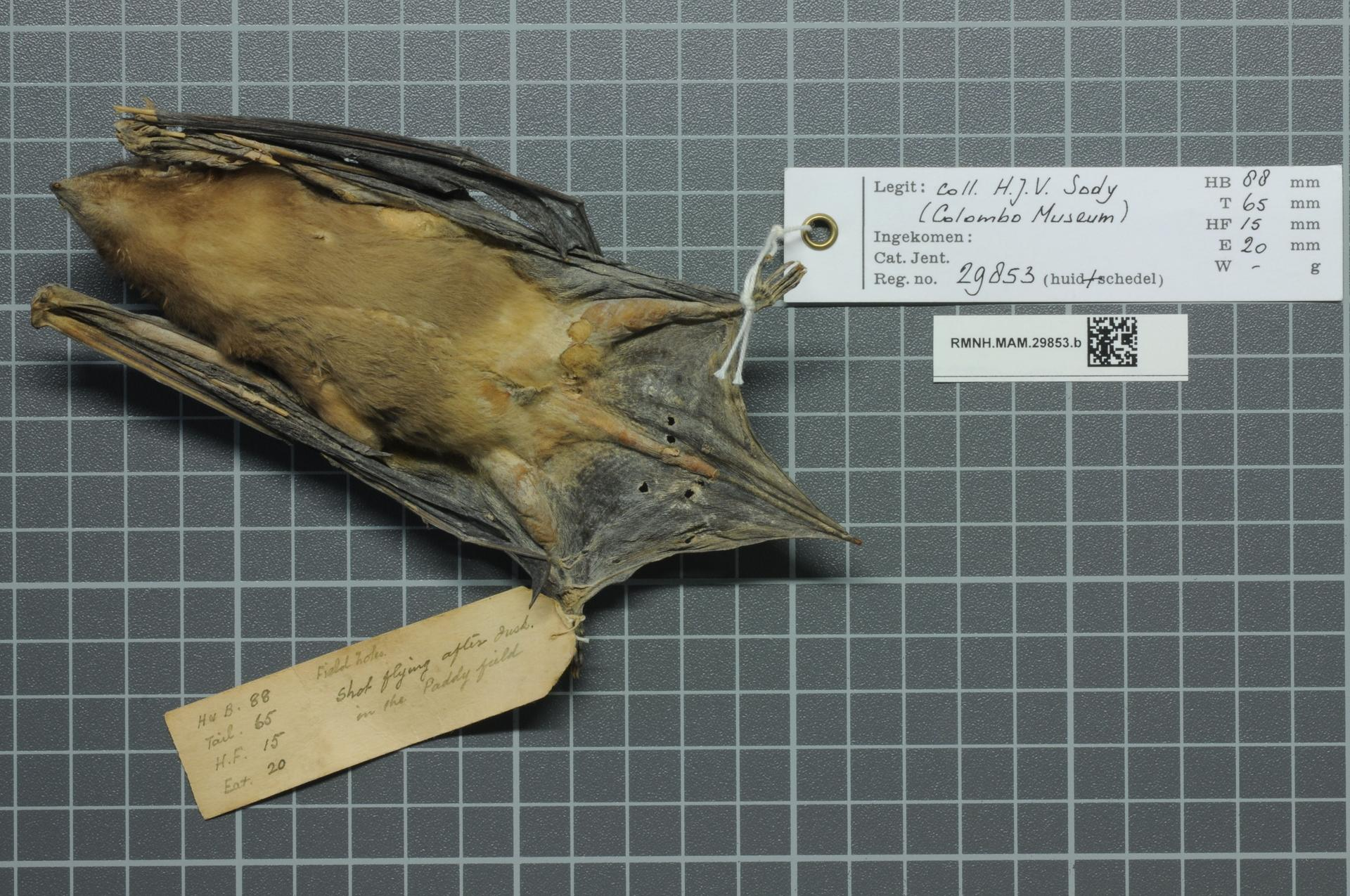

Conservation status
- Least Concern (IUCN 3.1)

Scientific classification
- Kingdom: Animalia
- Phylum: Chordata
- Class: Mammalia
- Order: Chiroptera
- Family: Vespertilionidae
- Genus: Scotophilus
- Species: S. robustus

Binomial name
- Scotophilus robustus Milne-Edwards, 1881
- Robust yellow bat range

= Robust yellow bat =

Species of bat

The robust yellow bat (Scotophilus robustus) is a species of vesper bat. It is found only in Madagascar.
