= Malagasy yellow bat =

Conservation status
- Data Deficient (IUCN 3.1)

Scientific classification
- Kingdom: Animalia
- Phylum: Chordata
- Class: Mammalia
- Order: Chiroptera
- Family: Vespertilionidae
- Genus: Scotophilus
- Species: S. tandrefana

Binomial name
- Scotophilus tandrefana Goodman, Jenkins & Ratrimomanarivo, 2005
- Range map

Species of bat

The Malagasy yellow bat (Scotophilus tandrefana), sometimes known as the western yellow bat, is a species of vesper bat endemic to Madagascar.

== Taxonomy and etymology ==
It was described as a new species in 2005. The holotype was collected in 2003 just outside the Tsingy de Bemaraha Strict Nature Reserve in Madagascar. Its species name "tandrefana" is Malagasy for "from the west".

== Description ==
It has a forearm length of approximately 47 mm (1.9 in), a tail length of 46 mm (1.8 in), and an ear length of 13 mm (0.51 in). The holotype weighed 14.2 g (0.50 oz). The fur of its back is dark brown, while its belly fur is a medium shade of brown. It uses echolocation to navigate and find prey: it utilizes steep frequency-modulated echolocation (FM) as well as that of a quasi-constant frequency (QCF). Its echolocation reaches maximum energy around 48.2 kHz. Minimum frequency is 42.2 kHz, while maximum frequency is 91.2 kHz.

== Conservation ==
As of 2019, it is listed as a data deficient species by the IUCN.
