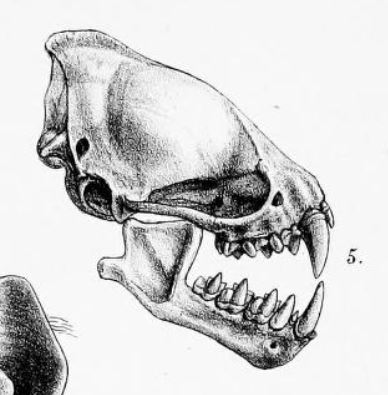

Conservation status
- Least Concern (IUCN 3.1)

Scientific classification
- Kingdom: Animalia
- Phylum: Chordata
- Class: Mammalia
- Order: Chiroptera
- Family: Vespertilionidae
- Genus: Scotophilus
- Species: S. collinus

Binomial name
- Scotophilus collinus Sody, 1936

= Sody's yellow bat =

Species of bat

Sody's yellow bat or Sody's yellow house bat (Scotophilus collinus) is a species of vesper bat. It is native to Island Southeast Asia, where it is found in Indonesia, Malaysia, and Timor-Leste. This species was described in 1936.
