= Marovaza yellow bat =

Conservation status
- Least Concern (IUCN 3.1)

Scientific classification
- Kingdom: Animalia
- Phylum: Chordata
- Class: Mammalia
- Order: Chiroptera
- Family: Vespertilionidae
- Genus: Scotophilus
- Species: S. marovaza

Binomial name
- Scotophilus marovaza Goodman, Ratrimomanarivo & Randrianandrianina, 2006
- Range of the Marovaza house bat

Species of bat

The Marovaza yellow bat or Marovaza house bat (Scotophilus marovaza) is a species of bat found in Madagascar.

== Taxonomy and etymology ==
It was described as a new species in 2006. The holotype was collected in Marovaza, Madagascar, which inspired its species name.

== Description ==
It is relatively small for its genus. Its forearm is approximately 43.5 mm (1.71 in) long.

== Biology and ecology ==
It has been found roosting in the palm-leave thatching of small huts. It roosts singly or in small colonies of up to five individuals. It navigates and locates prey via echolocation; its calls have a frequency of maximum energy of 43.8–48 kHz and a maximum frequency of 58–72.6 kHz. Echolocation pulses last 6–8 seconds. Individuals can be infected with Leptospira.

== Range and habitat ==
The Marovaza house bat is endemic to western Madagascar. It is currently known from lowland areas of 5–200 m (16–656 ft) above sea level.

== Conservation ==
As of 2017, it is evaluated as a least-concern species by the IUCN.
