= Robbins's yellow bat =

Conservation status
- Data Deficient (IUCN 3.1)

Scientific classification
- Kingdom: Animalia
- Phylum: Chordata
- Class: Mammalia
- Order: Chiroptera
- Family: Vespertilionidae
- Genus: Scotophilus
- Species: S. nucella

Binomial name
- Scotophilus nucella Robbins, 1983

Species of bat

Robbins's yellow bat (Scotophilus nucella) is a species of vesper bat. It is found in Ivory Coast, Ghana, and Uganda.
