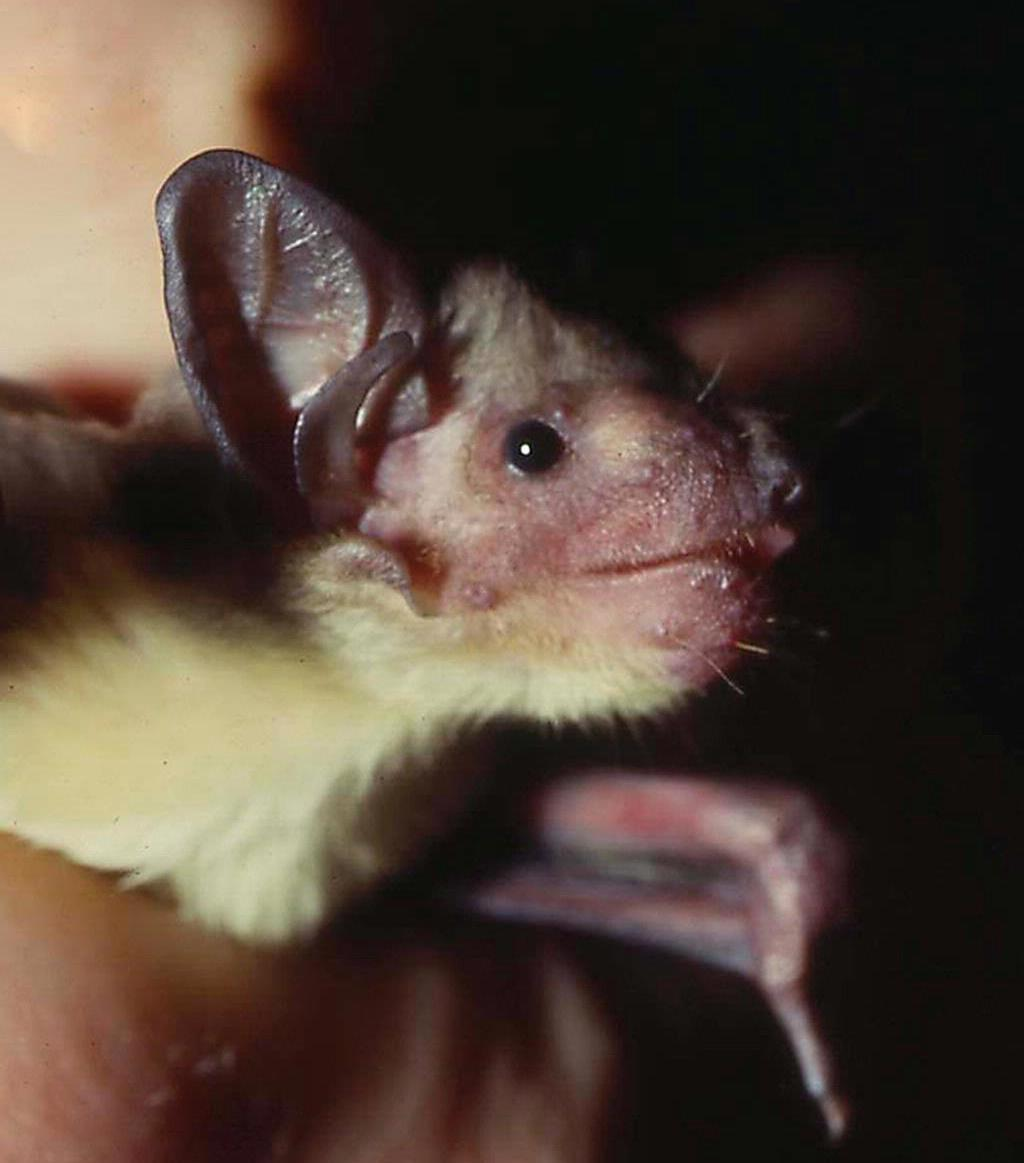
- An unidentified Scotophilus, possibly Scotophilus dinganii

Scientific classification
- Kingdom: Animalia
- Phylum: Chordata
- Class: Mammalia
- Order: Chiroptera
- Family: Vespertilionidae
- Subfamily: Vespertilioninae
- Tribe: Scotophilini; Hill and Harrison, 1987
- Genus: Scotophilus; Leach, 1821

Type species
- Scotophilus kuhlii Leach, 1821

Species
- See text

= Scotophilus =

Genus of bats

Scotophilus is a genus of vespertilionid bats commonly called yellow bats. They are found in southern Asia and Africa. They are the only members of the tribe Scotophilini.

== Species ==
- East African yellow bat, Scotophilus altilis
- Andrew Rebori's house bat, Scotophilus andrewreborii
- Lesser yellow bat, Scotophilus borbonicus
- Sulawesi yellow bat, Scotophilus celebensis
- Eritrean yellow bat, Scotophilus colias
- Sody's yellow bat, Scotophilus collinus
- African yellow bat, Scotophilus dinganii
- Ejeta's yellow bat, Scotophilus ejetai
- Greater Asiatic yellow bat, Scotophilus heathi
- Lesser Asiatic yellow bat, Scotophilus kuhlii
- White-bellied yellow bat, Scotophilus leucogaster
- Livingstone's yellow bat, Scotophilus livingstonii
- Marovaza yellow bat, Scotophilus marovaza
- Schreber's yellow bat, Scotophilus nigrita
- Western greenish yellow bat, Scotophilus nigritellus
- Robbins's yellow bat, Scotophilus nucella'
- Nut-colored yellow bat, Scotophilus nux
- Robust yellow bat, Scotophilus robustus
- Malagasy yellow bat, Scotophilus tandrefana
- Trujillo's yellow bat, Scotophilus trujilloi
- Eastern greenish yellow bat, Scotophilus viridis

== Physical characteristics ==
The African yellow house bat (Scotophilus dinganii) is larger than the lesser Asiatic yellow house bat but smaller than the giant yellow house bat. The average body length is 130 mm (5.1 in) and the weight is about 27 grams (0.95 oz). The African yellow house bat's face looks similar to that of a dog. The wings can be shades of either olive, grey or red. The back is covered with soft, short fur with a hint of brown, and the abdomen is covered with bright yellow fur. The color of the interfemoral membrane is brown and transparent.

The lesser Asiatic yellow house bat (S. kuhlii) is smaller and leaner than the African yellow house bat. The total body length is about 120 mm (4.7 in) and the average body weight is around 16 grams (0.56 oz). The forearm length can extend up to 52 mm (2.0 in). A unique physical characteristic of the lesser yellow house bat is the tail, which is long and covered with the interfemoral membrane between the hind legs. The lesser Asiatic yellow house bat has pointy ears and a dog-like face with a dull muzzle. The lesser Asiatic yellow house bat has soft dense yellowish-brown fur on the back. The abdomen fur is composed of either a white or off-white color.

The greater Asiatic yellow house bat (Scotophilus heathii) is yellow-brown in color with a small hint of green on the back. The average forearm length is about 58 mm (2.3 in). The face of the greater Asiatic yellow house bat, like the other two, also resembles a dog's face. The belly is covered with bright yellow fur.

== Behavior and ecology ==
Although an individual may roost singly, yellow house bats are grouping mammals. The amount of grouping yellow house bats varies depending on the capacity of a living place. A large cave can generate colonies of less than a hundred; otherwise, groups of 12 to 30 bats max is the common grouping amount in artificial habitats. Some yellow house bats may have more than just one roosting site around the foraging areas. This behavior serves as a mechanism of avoiding predation, interpreted by biologists. Yellow house bats are quite common in suburban areas. They live in nooks and crannies of houses, and are very quiet. Thus, it is difficult for humans to detect their movements nearby because they tend to fly very low at a steady speed, and they only go out for food when the sun sets. Once they go out for food, they continue to feast for approximately 2 hours to reach their full satiety, then rest during daytime.

=== Reproduction ===
Like most other species of bats, yellow house bats give birth annually. A birth will often consist of two twin bats. The newborn bats are capable of flight at a very early age, allowing them to defend themselves and participate in the feeding frenzy. Yellow house bats have a unique method of ensuring its pups' survival. When these bats breed, the female will postpone fertilization if necessary in order to time the birth so that the pups are born when prey is at its peak in numbers. Yellow house bats are polygynous; they have multiple sexual partners during their mating season. The males of this species are competitive for female attention. They will defend the female if other males come into its territory. The range of a male's territory depends on the resources that are readily available at the time. The more abundant the food and shelter for the male, the smaller the territory it needs to defend. The female moves from roost-to-roost, usually in different male territories. Yellow house bats feed for about two hours a day.

=== Diet ===
Yellow house bats are fond of small insects. Depending on the habitats at the different regions, yellow house bats have different food preys. They prefer to feed on airborne insects, hymenopterans and dipterans, which can be found under the canopies of tall trees and riparian forests at nights. Small insects such as wasps, bees, moths, and beetles are all fearful of yellow house bats. Larger soft-bodied insects can also become yellow house bats' food.

=== Predators ===
Although secondary consumers such as owls, hawks, raccoons, snakes and gymnogene consume yellow house bats, these animals do not target bats as a primary food source due to the bats' nocturnal activity, while other predators tend to be diurnal.

== Habitat and distribution ==
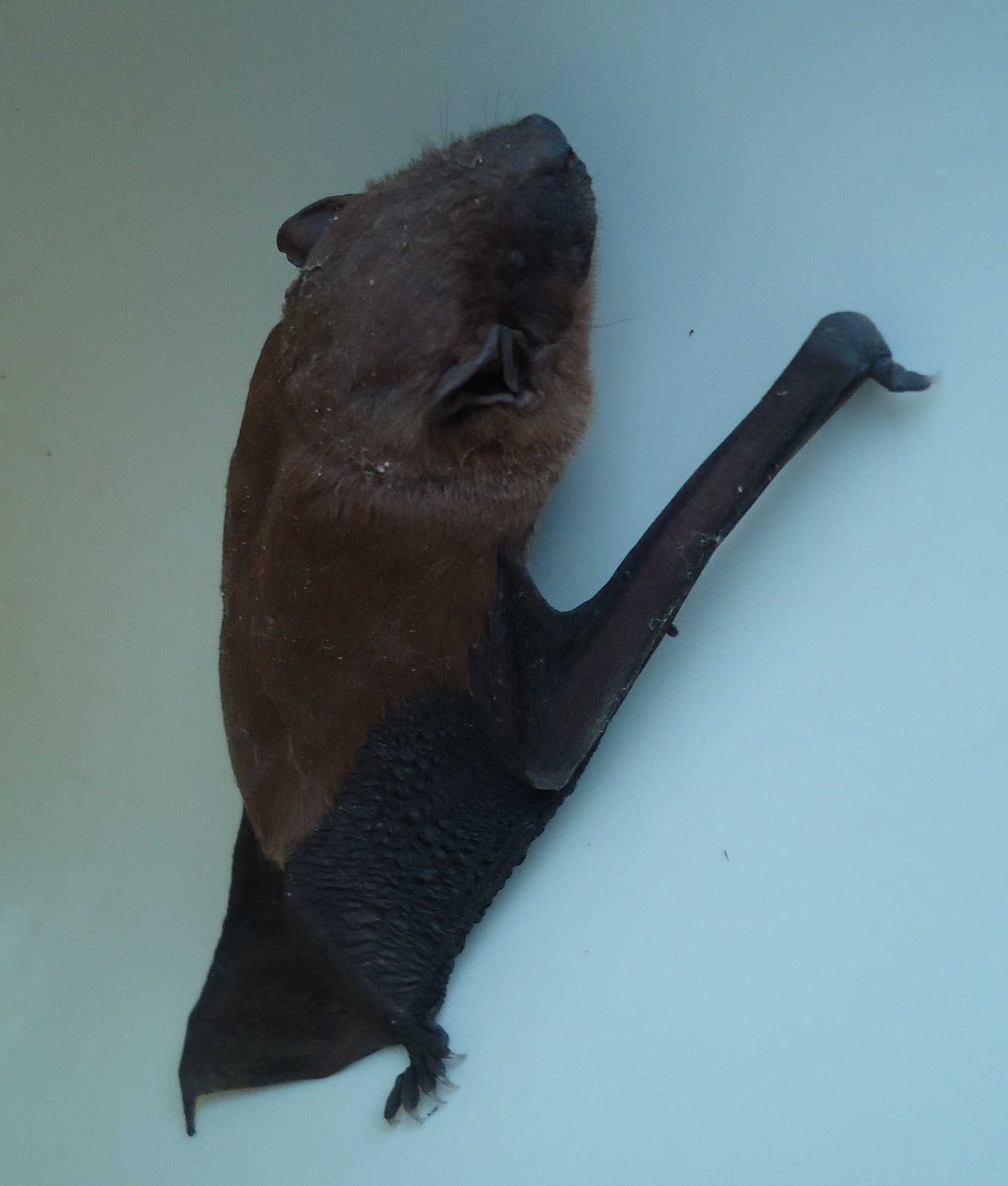
Scotophilus kuhlii from the Philippines. They are commonly found in man-made structures.

Yellow house bats live in various habitats, ranging from woodland savannas, forests to mountains. However, they can also co-exist with humans in rural and urban areas. In the natural environments, they roost in dark caves, the dried leaves of palm trees, hollow tree trunks and so forth. In the vicinity of people, they live in crevices, cracks and holes in building walls, on the roofs of old houses and between overlapping corrugated iron sheets. Yellow house bats derive their name from their ease of adaptation to human presence. Whether they reside in natural surroundings or man-made constructions, they tuck themselves into narrow dark clefts. Some yellow house bats have a high tolerance for harsh weather; it is reported that African Yellow House Bats can live in both dry and moist Saharan habitats.

The Sulawesi Yellow House Bat (Scotophilus celebensis) received its name from its location in Sulawesi, Indonesia. The population is currently unknown, as is the population trend. They tend to live in rather small colonies.

The Sody's Yellow House Bat (Scotophilus collinus) can be found in western Java, Bali, Lombok, Flores, Timor, Semau and Rote islands in Indonesia, and Sabah in Malaysian Borneo. They have also been found on Lembata and the Aru Islands, possibly also on two islands in Indonesia. Like the Sulawesi Yellow House Bat, very little to nothing about its population is known.

The African Yellow (House) Bat (Scotophilus dinganii) has a range in sub-Saharan Africa, from Senegal and the Gambia in the west to Ethiopia in the east, south to South Africa, Lesotho and Eswatini. There is no recording of this bat's population either.

The Greater Asiatic Yellow House Bat (Scotophilus heathii), also known as the Common Yellow House Bat, is located in South and Southeast Asia, ranging throughout China, Thailand, Vietnam, Cambodia, Afghanistan, Bangladesh, India, Nepal, Pakistan and Sri Lanka. The bat has been documented from sea level to 1,500 metres (4,900 ft). The population is high and stable.

The Lesser Asiatic Yellow House Bat (Scotophilus kuhlii) has a range similar to that of the Greater Asiatic Yellow House Bat's location, with the exception of some countries. The population trend is also the same as the Greater Asiatic Yellow House Bat.
