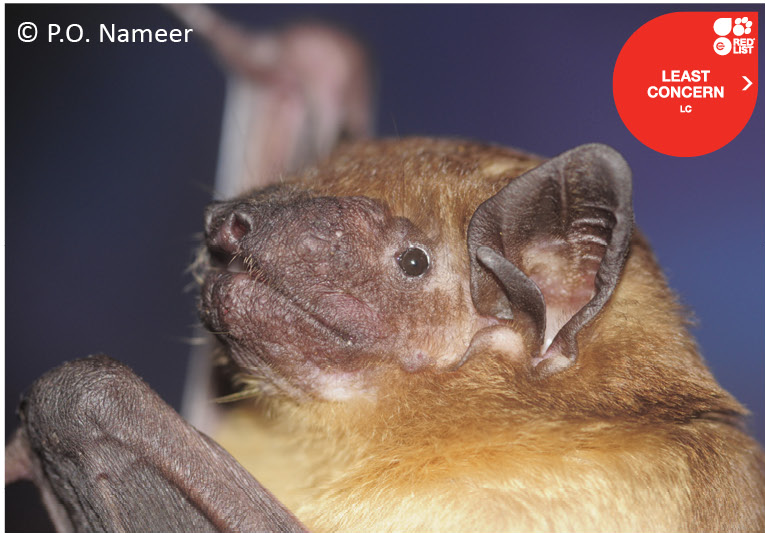

Conservation status
- Least Concern (IUCN 3.1)

Scientific classification
- Kingdom: Animalia
- Phylum: Chordata
- Class: Mammalia
- Order: Chiroptera
- Family: Vespertilionidae
- Genus: Scotophilus
- Species: S. heathii

Binomial name
- Scotophilus heathii Horsfield, 1831
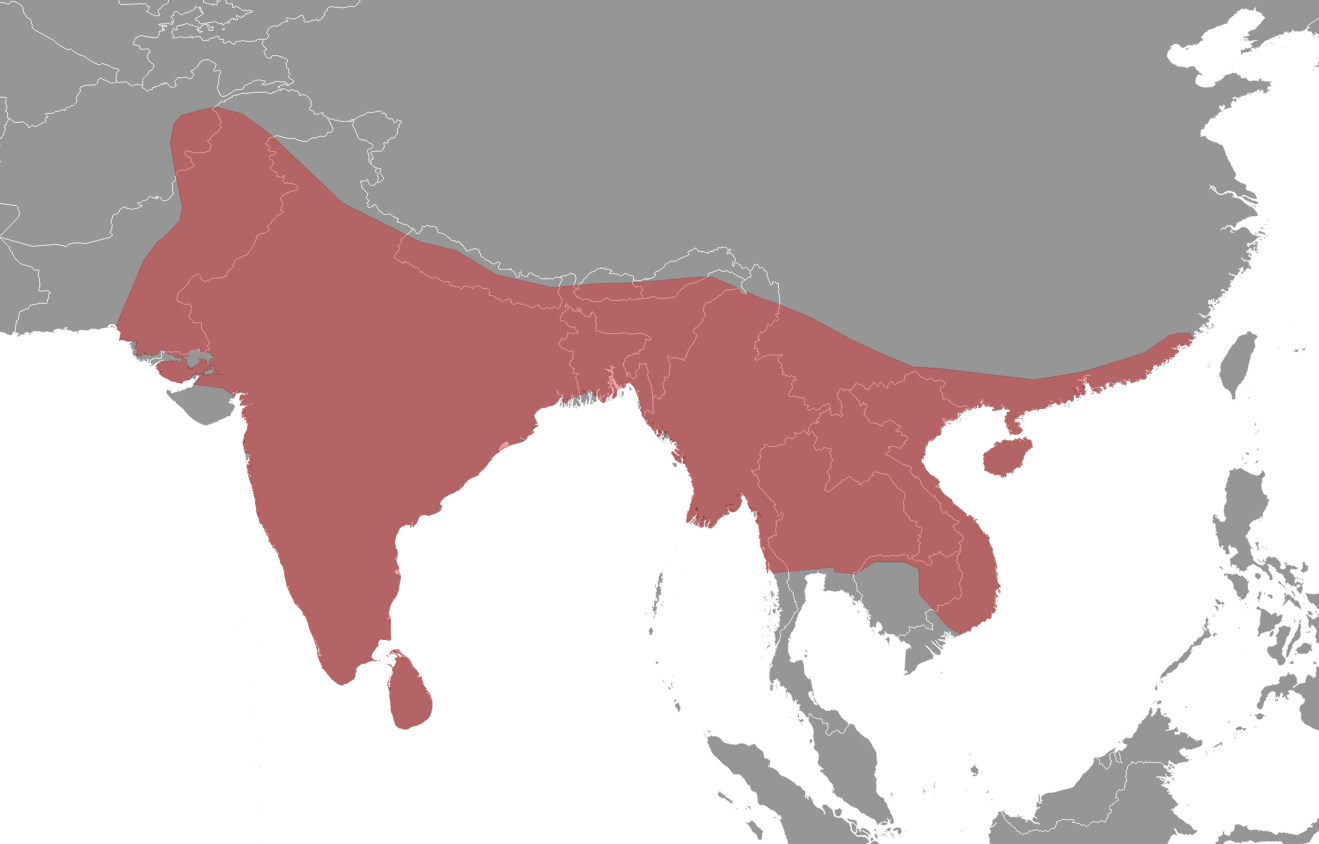

= Greater Asiatic yellow bat =

Species of bat

The greater Asiatic yellow bat (Scotophilus heathii) is a species of vesper bat. It is found in Afghanistan, Bangladesh, Cambodia, China, India, Indonesia, Laos, Myanmar, Nepal, Pakistan, Philippines, Sri Lanka, Thailand and Vietnam.

Like many bats, females have delayed ovulation, with the ability to store sperm. This makes them particularly of interest to biologists. Studies have shown that seasonal changes in hormones allow them to deposit fat before the onset of winter.

It is named after Josiah Marshall Heath, who presented the type specimen to the Zoological Society of London.

== Description ==
The head and body length of the greater Asiatic yellow bat is 8–9 centimetres (3.1–3.5 in), the forearms measure 6–7 cm (2.4–2.8 in), and the wingspan is40 cm (16 in). The bats weighs 48–52 g (1.7–1.8 oz).

Adults are yellowish bronze brown above and bright yellow to reddish below. Wing membrane is blackish brown. Short and dense fur except on neck. Muzzle is blunt, naked, and dark. Tragus is crescent-shaped and separated from the posterior margin of the pinna by a conspicuous notch. Long tailed. Young are dark grayish brown.
