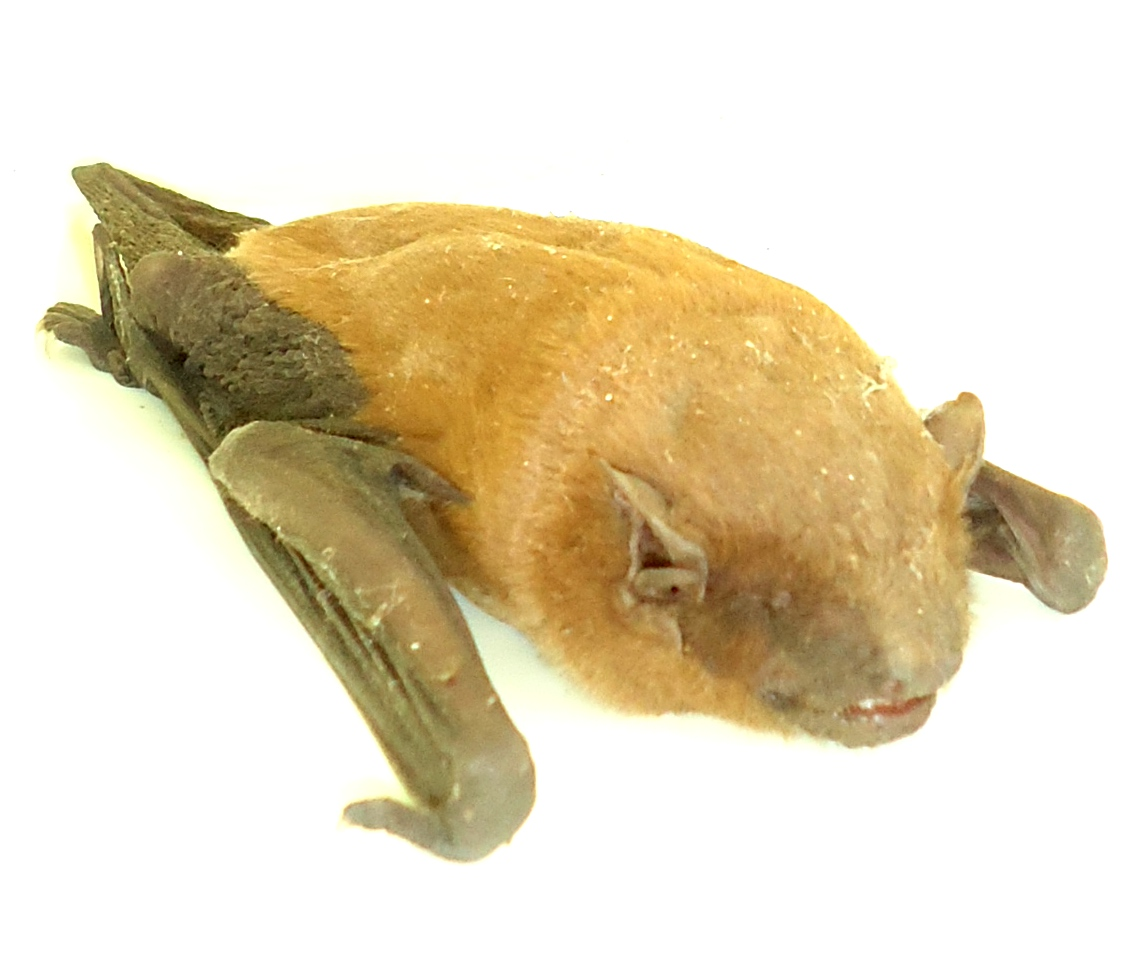
- from Bukidnon, Philippines

Conservation status
- Least Concern (IUCN 3.1)

Scientific classification
- Kingdom: Animalia
- Phylum: Chordata
- Class: Mammalia
- Order: Chiroptera
- Family: Vespertilionidae
- Genus: Scotophilus
- Species: S. kuhlii

Binomial name
- Scotophilus kuhlii Leach, 1821
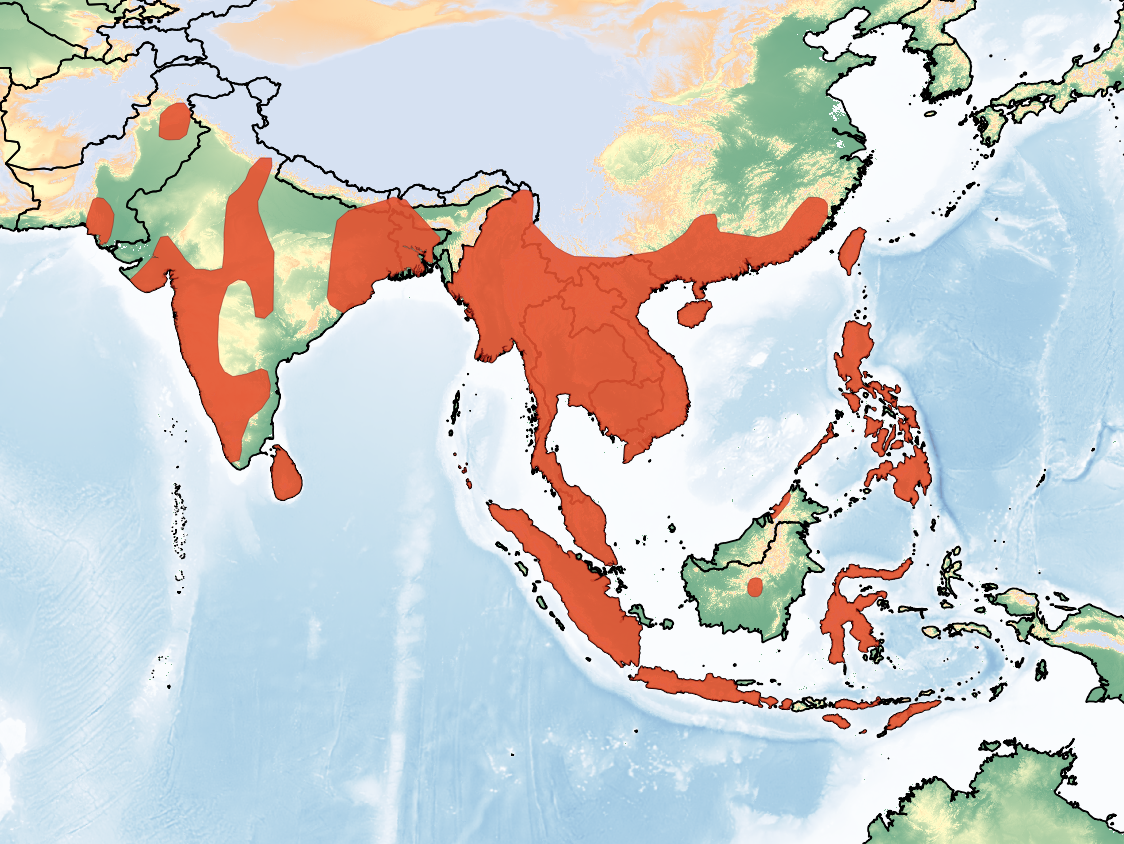

Synonyms
- Vespertilio temminckii Horsfield, 1824

= Lesser Asiatic yellow bat =

Species of bat

The lesser Asiatic yellow bat (Scotophilus kuhlii) is a species of vesper bat. It is found in Bangladesh, Cambodia, India, Indonesia, Malaysia, Pakistan, the Philippines, Sri Lanka, and Taiwan.
