= Trujillo's yellow bat =

Conservation status
- Least Concern (IUCN 3.1)

Scientific classification
- Domain: Eukaryota
- Kingdom: Animalia
- Phylum: Chordata
- Class: Mammalia
- Order: Chiroptera
- Family: Vespertilionidae
- Genus: Scotophilus
- Species: S. trujilloi

Binomial name
- Scotophilus trujilloi Brooks & Bickham, 2014
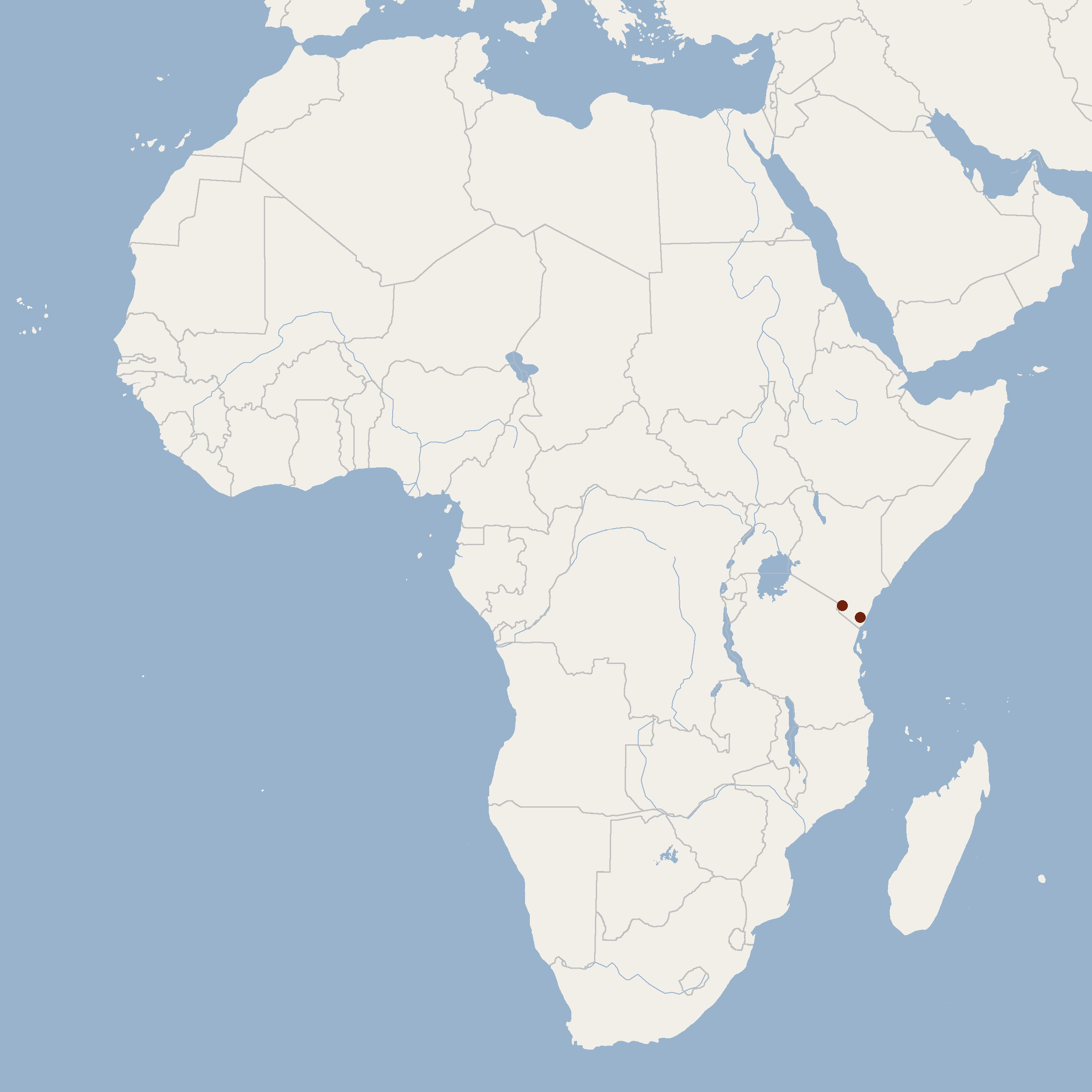
- Range map

Species of bat

Trujillo's yellow bat or Trujillo's house bat (Scotophilus trujilloi) is a species of vesper bat endemic to Kenya.

== Taxonomy and etymology ==
It was described as a new species in 2014. The holotype was collected in 1985 in Kwale County, Kenya. The eponym for the species name "trujilloi" is Robert Trujillo. Trujillo's work on the molecular systematics of Scotophilus bats "paved the way" for the description of this species and three others.

== Description ==
Trujillo's house bat has reddish-mahogany fur on its back and grayish-orange fur on its belly. Its forearm length ranges from 43.8–46.2 mm (1.72–1.82 in).

== Range and habitat ==
Trujillo's house bat is endemic to Kenya, where it is found in the Coast Province. It has been documented at elevations of 0–760 m (0–2,493 ft) above sea level.

== Conservation ==
As of 2017, it is evaluated as a least-concern species by the IUCN. Its range includes at least one protected area, the Shimba Hills National Reserve. It is possibly quite tolerant of human-mediated landscape disturbance. It is threatened by the intentional destruction of its roosts.
