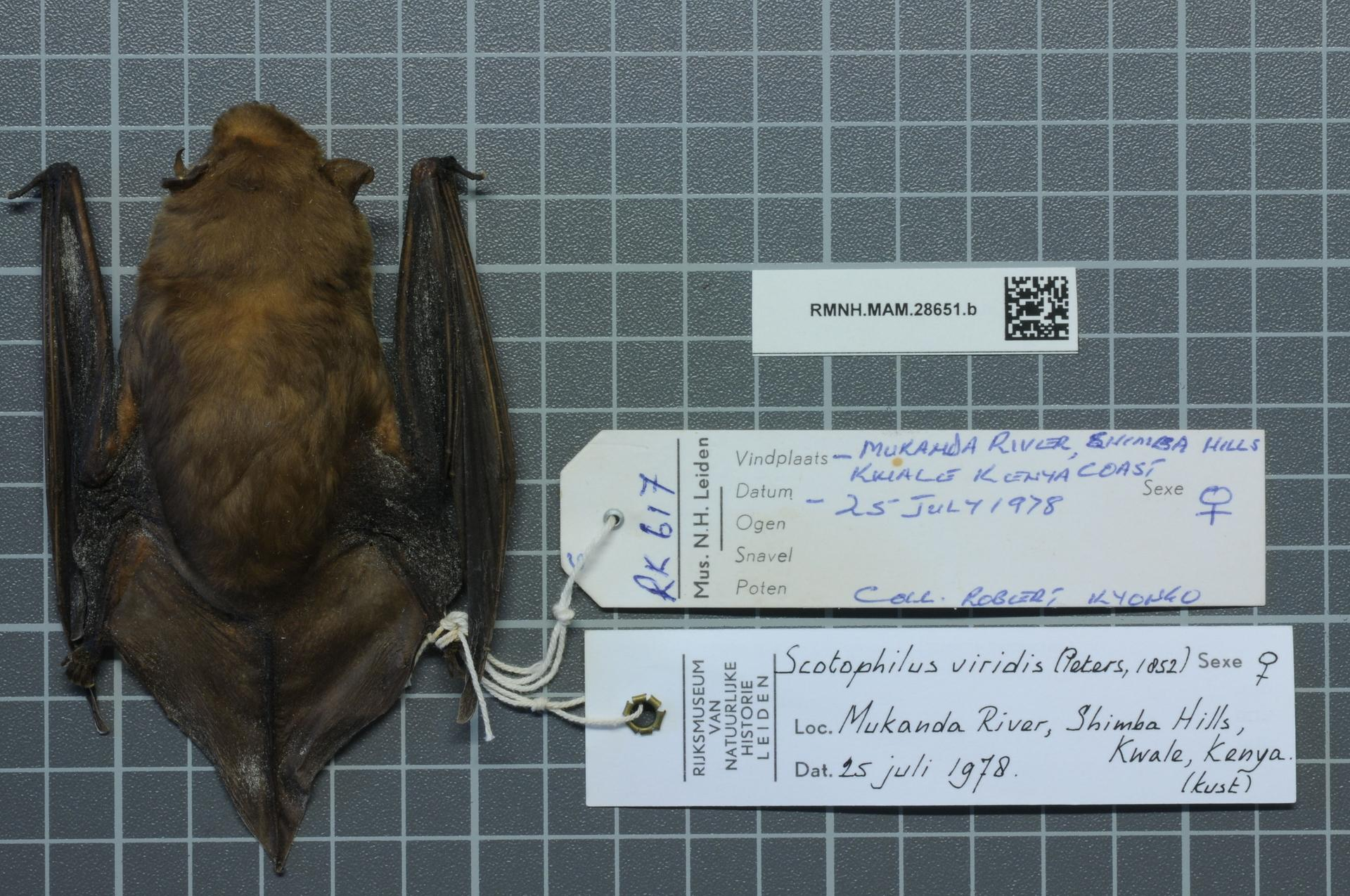

Conservation status
- Least Concern (IUCN 3.1)

Scientific classification
- Kingdom: Animalia
- Phylum: Chordata
- Class: Mammalia
- Order: Chiroptera
- Family: Vespertilionidae
- Genus: Scotophilus
- Species: S. viridis

Binomial name
- Scotophilus viridis (Peters, 1852)

Synonyms
- Nycticejus viridis

= Eastern greenish yellow bat =

Species of bat

The eastern greenish yellow bat (Scotophilus viridis) is a species of vesper bat. It is found in Botswana, Central African Republic, Eswatini, Ethiopia, Kenya, Malawi, Mozambique, South Africa, Tanzania, Zambia, and Zimbabwe. Its natural habitats are dry and moist savanna.

The western greenish yellow bat (S. nigritellus) of western Africa was formerly considered conspecific.
