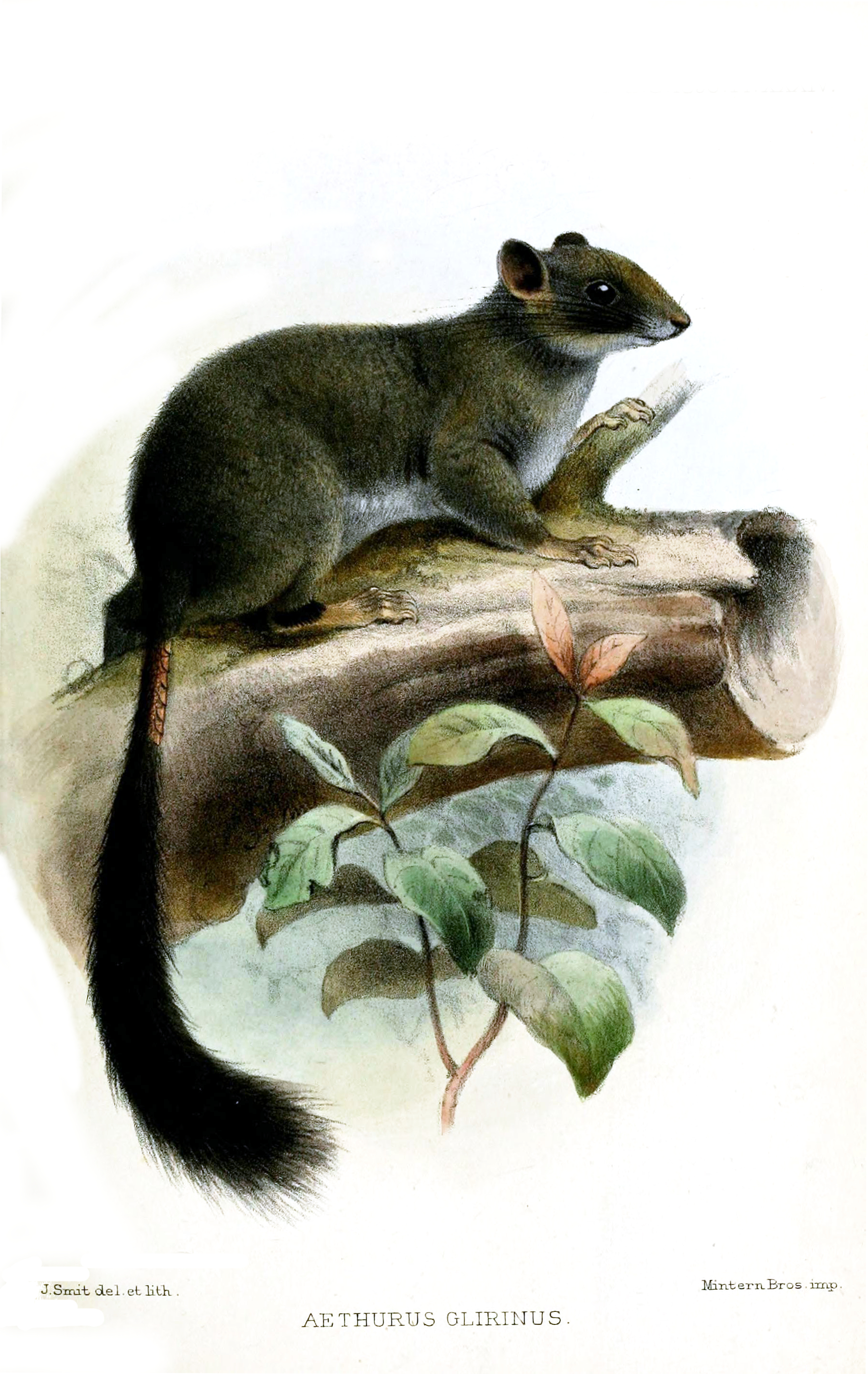

Conservation status
- Least Concern (IUCN 3.1)

Scientific classification
- Kingdom: Animalia
- Phylum: Chordata
- Class: Mammalia
- Infraclass: Placentalia
- Order: Rodentia
- Family: Zenkerellidae
- Genus: Zenkerella
- Species: Z. insignis

Binomial name
- Zenkerella insignis Matschie, 1898

= Cameroon scaly-tail =

Cameroon scaly-tail Temporal range: Early Miocene to recent (genus) 20–0 Ma

Species of rodent

The Cameroon scaly-tail (Zenkerella insignis), also referred to as the Cameroon anomalure, flightless anomalure or flightless scaly-tail, is a rodent species endemic to West Central Africa. The first photograph of a live specimen was taken in 2016 by a trap camera in Cameroon, with the first high quality image being taken in May of 2019. The taxonomic classification of the species has been subject to recent revision.

== Phylogeny ==
Previous common names for this species included flightless scaly-tail 'squirrel', but this is a misnomer as anomalures are very distantly related to the true squirrels of the rodent family Sciuridae and only superficially resemble them. Z. insignis is the only extant species in the genus Zenkerella and family Zenkerellidae and is the only surviving species of a lineage that diverged from the other extant anomalures (genera Idiurus and Anomalurus) ~49 million years ago (Ma). Among mammals, very few species are the sole survivors of such ancient lineages, some other examples being the pen-tailed treeshrew and the monito del monte.

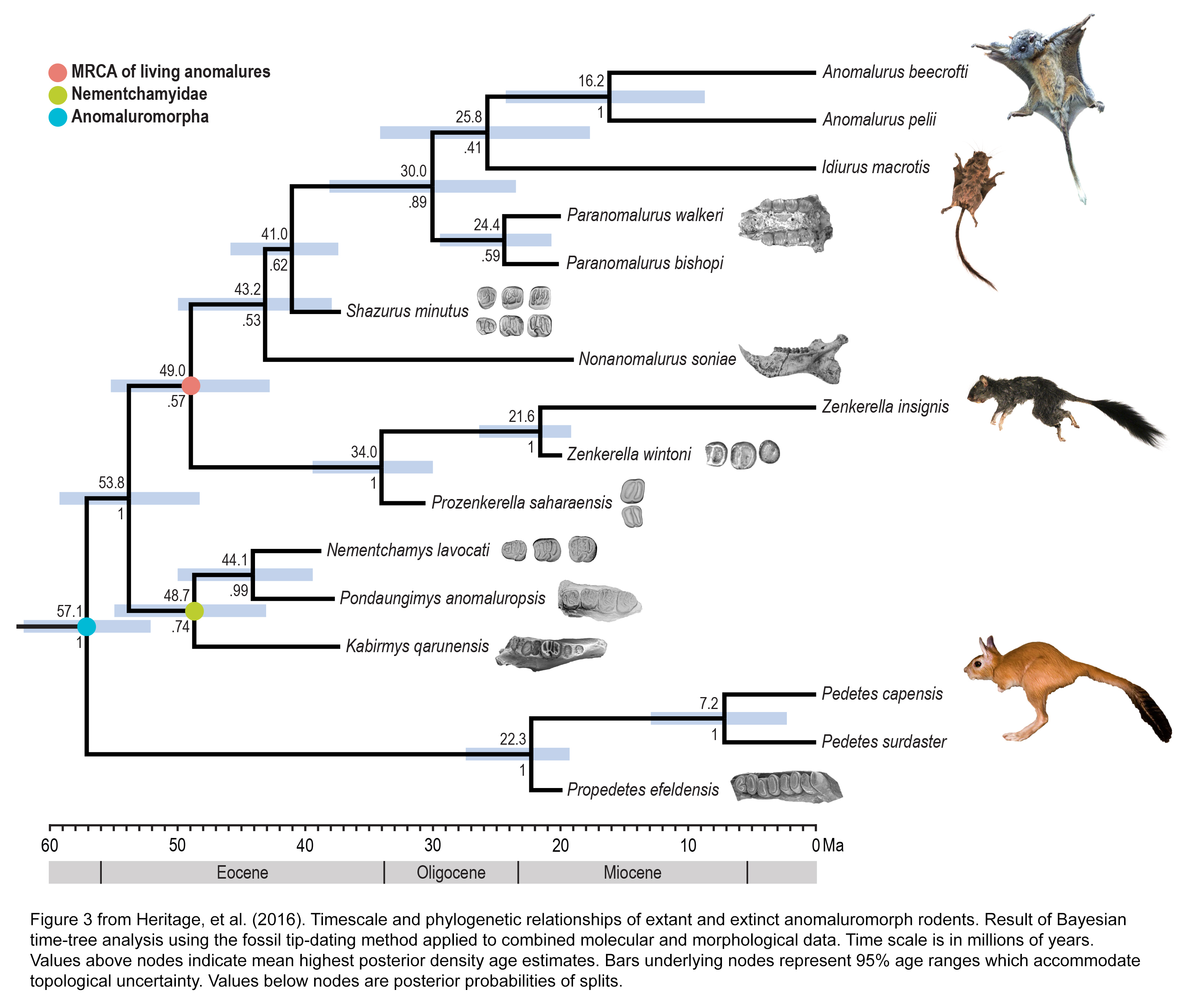
Timescale and phylogenetic relationships of extant and extinct anomaluromorph rodents.

Extinct fossil taxa which are putative close relatives of Z. insignis include: Zenkerella wintoni (~20 Ma, early Miocene, Kenya), Prozenkerella saharaensis (~31 Ma, early Oligocene, Libya), and possibly Oromys zenkerellinopsis (~33 Ma, earliest Oligocene, Morocco).

In 2016, it was reported that three whole-body specimens of Z. insignis were recovered on Bioko Island, Equatorial Guinea. At that time, it had been over 20 years since the scientific literature recorded new individuals. These specimens were used to sequence portions of the Z. insignis genome. Phylogenetic analysis using combined DNA and anatomical data place Zenkerella as the sister taxon of an Idiurus-Anomalurus clade. This is contrary to a previous hypothesis that grouped Zenkerella with Idiurus within the family Anomaluridae. The Z. insignis position in the rodent evolutionary tree supports a single origin of the anomalure gliding adaptation with no evolutionary reversals; more complex evolutionary scenarios were previously envisioned. The same analysis estimated an early Oligocene origin of anomalure gliding and an early Eocene divergence of the Z. insignis lineage. These results were used to justify a taxonomic revision that erected the new rodent family Zenkerellidae in which Z. insignis is the only living species.

== Morphology ==
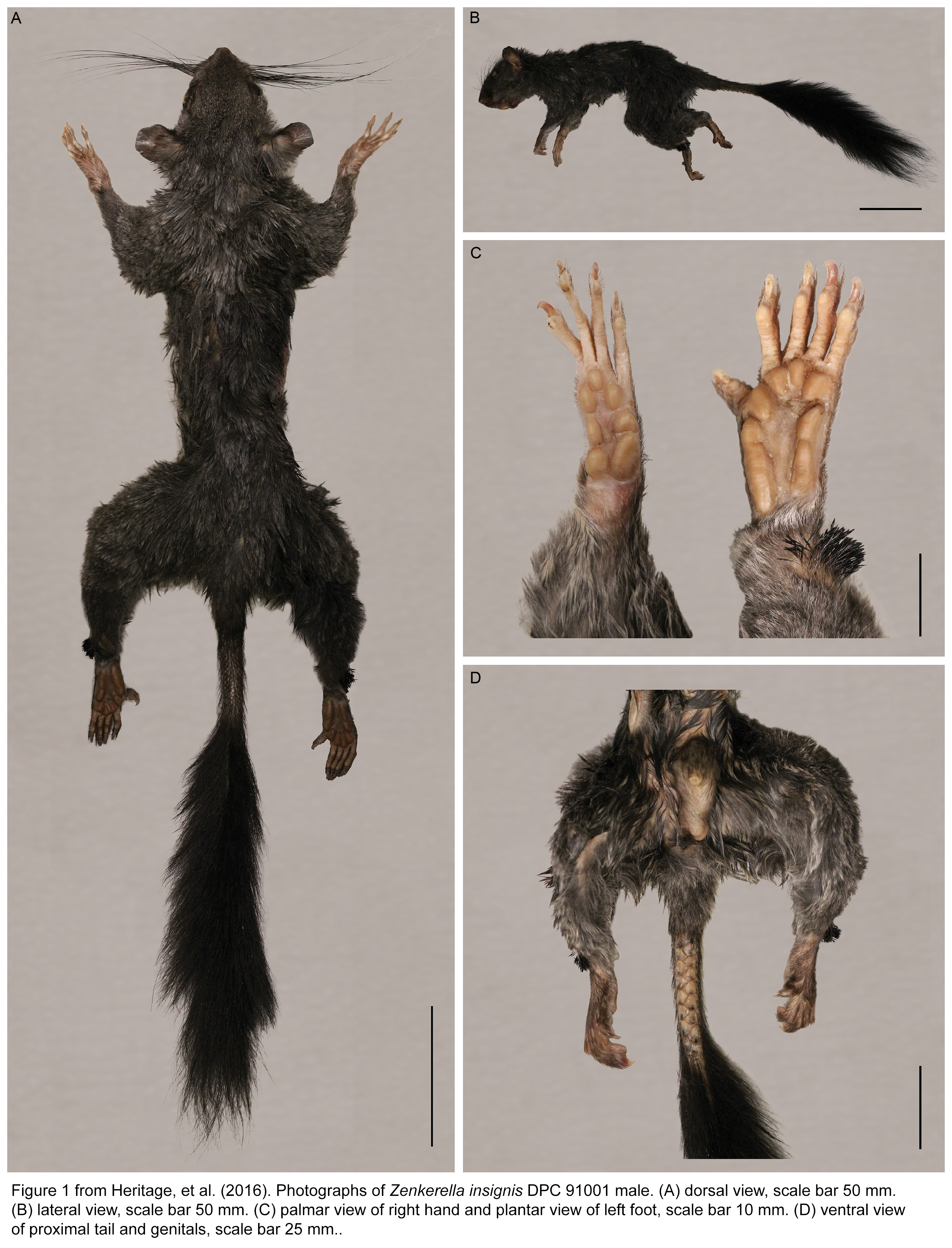
Photographs of a male museum specimen.

The anomalures, including Z. insignis, are unique among rodents in having a set of scales on the ventral surface of the base of the tail. These scales reportedly provide traction when climbing trees. While the scaly tail organ at the base of the Cameroon Scaly tail’s tail acts as a gripping mechanism and helps enhance the animal's static stability, also acting as a skid reduction mechanism. The fluffed tail forms a spherical shape and is hypothesized for either intraspecific signaling or to distract predators, acting as a defensive mechanicm. Z. insignis is the only anomalure that lacks patagia (membranes that span between the forelimbs and hindlimbs). Anomalures that possess patagia are able to glide between trees. Thus, Z. insignis is unable to glide. The divergence of the Z. insignis lineage from other extant anomalures apparently occurred before the evolution of anomalure gliding. Gliding is a relatively rare adaptation that has independently evolved in three lineages of extant placental mammals (anomalures, colugos, and flying squirrels). Z. insignis has ashy-grey pelage and bushy black tail hair. Tufts of short, course, and spikey hairs are located on the lateral ankles. The hands and feet have four and five digits respectively. Pedal digit I (the first toe) is somewhat divergent.

Z. insignis molars are distinct from other extant anomalures in having a continuous enamel crest that, in occlusal view, forms a full perimeter around the tooth and a single transverse crest divides the occlusal surface into two basins. The fossilized molars of Z. wintoni and P. saharaensis also have these features and the lineage's tooth morphology is essentially unchanged since the early Oligocene. In mammals, dental morphology is an excellent indicator of the animal's diet; it therefore seems that the lineage has retained the same dietary niche for at least 31 million years. Sole survivorship of an ancient lineage combined with the retention of morphology are characteristics which identify Z. insignis as a 'living fossil'. However, some biologists have questioned the usefulness of this popular term.

== Distribution and habitat ==
There are no (or possibly only obscure) entries in the scientific literature that document direct observations of living Z. insignis individuals. Although the species was first described in 1898, trapping efforts have resulted in only 14 specimens deposited in world natural history museums. From these specimens, the geographic distribution of Z. insignis is recorded from south Cameroon, Equatorial Guinea (including Bioko Island), southwestern Central African Republic, and Republic of Congo. The species is not recorded from Gabon but probably occurs there. Based on collection localities, Z. insignis inhabits rainforest and semi-deciduous forests. It has also been recorded from southwestern Nigeria on the citizen-science app iNaturalist, a significant range expansion for this species.

== Ecology ==
Without direct scientific observation, lifestyle and diet are largely inferred from what is known of other anomalures and anecdotal information gathered by interviewing local people and subsistence trappers. The species is probably largely arboreal but occasional captures in ground snares indicates it sometimes comes to the ground. Other anomalures are largely or exclusively nocturnal and sleep in tree-hollows during the day; these habits may also be true for Z. insignis. The species is probably herbivorous.

== Conservation ==
The IUCN previously assessed the species as Data Deficient, but in 2008 this was changed to the current listing of Least Concern as the species appears to have a relatively wide distribution with extensive suitable habitat, and occurs in several protected areas. However, some conservation biologists state that "This rating belies the fact that threats such as habitat loss and degradation are intense and widespread in central Africa" and "Zenkerella may be under greater threat".
