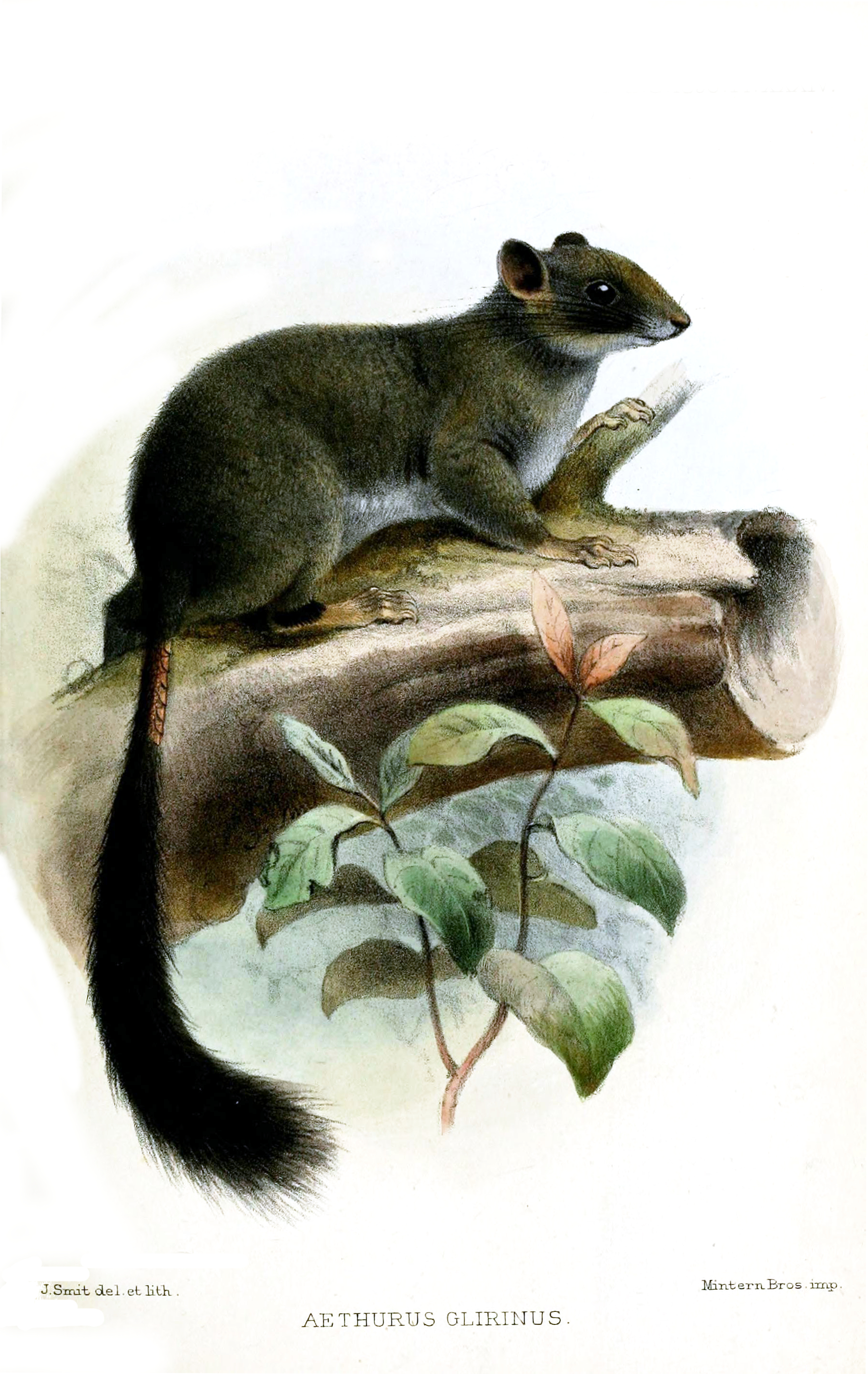

Scientific classification
- Kingdom: Animalia
- Phylum: Chordata
- Class: Mammalia
- Order: Rodentia
- Suborder: Anomaluromorpha
- Family: Zenkerellidae; Matschie, 1898
- Genus: Zenkerella; Matschie, 1898

Type species
- Zenkerella insignis Matschie, 1898

Species
- Zenkerella insignis; †Zenkerella wintoni
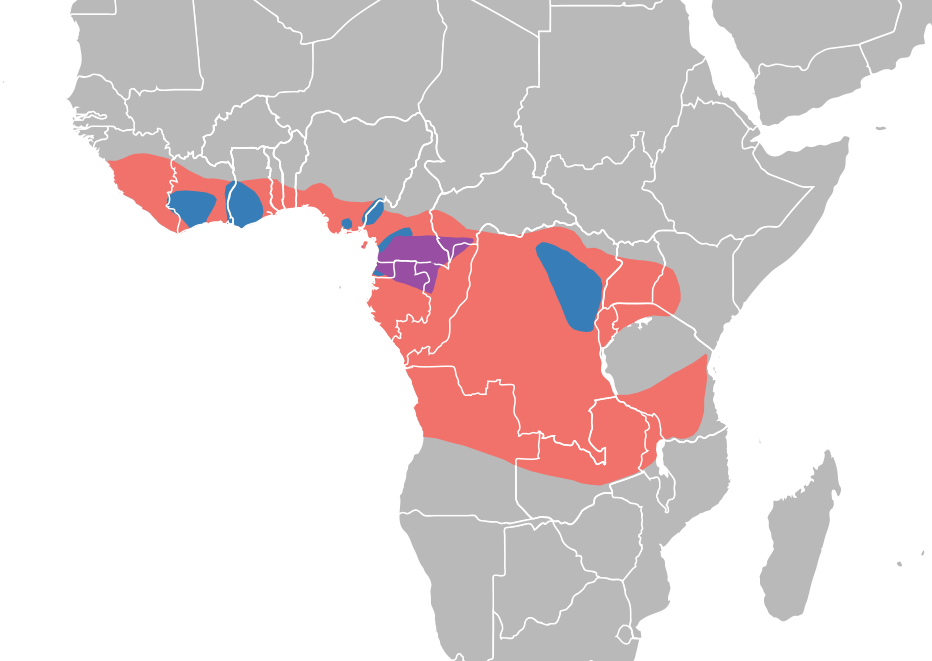
- Anomaluridae distribution. Anomalurus in red, Idiurus in blue, Zenkerella in purple.

= Zenkerella (rodent) =

Zenkerella Temporal range: Early Miocene to recent 20–0 Ma

Genus of rodent

Zenkerella is a genus of rodent, the only member of the family Zenkerellidae. It was formerly classified in Anomaluridae until phylogenetic studies made its distinctiveness clear. While the Anomalurus of the family Anomaluridae has gliding membranes between its forelimb and hindlimb, the Zenkerella has no such adaptation. It is estimated from fossil records that this divergence might have occurred in the middle of the Eocene.

There is a single extant species, the Cameroon scaly-tail, and a single fossil representative. The fossil species Zenkerella wintoni is known from a single mandible from Songhor, Kenya dated to the Early Miocene.
