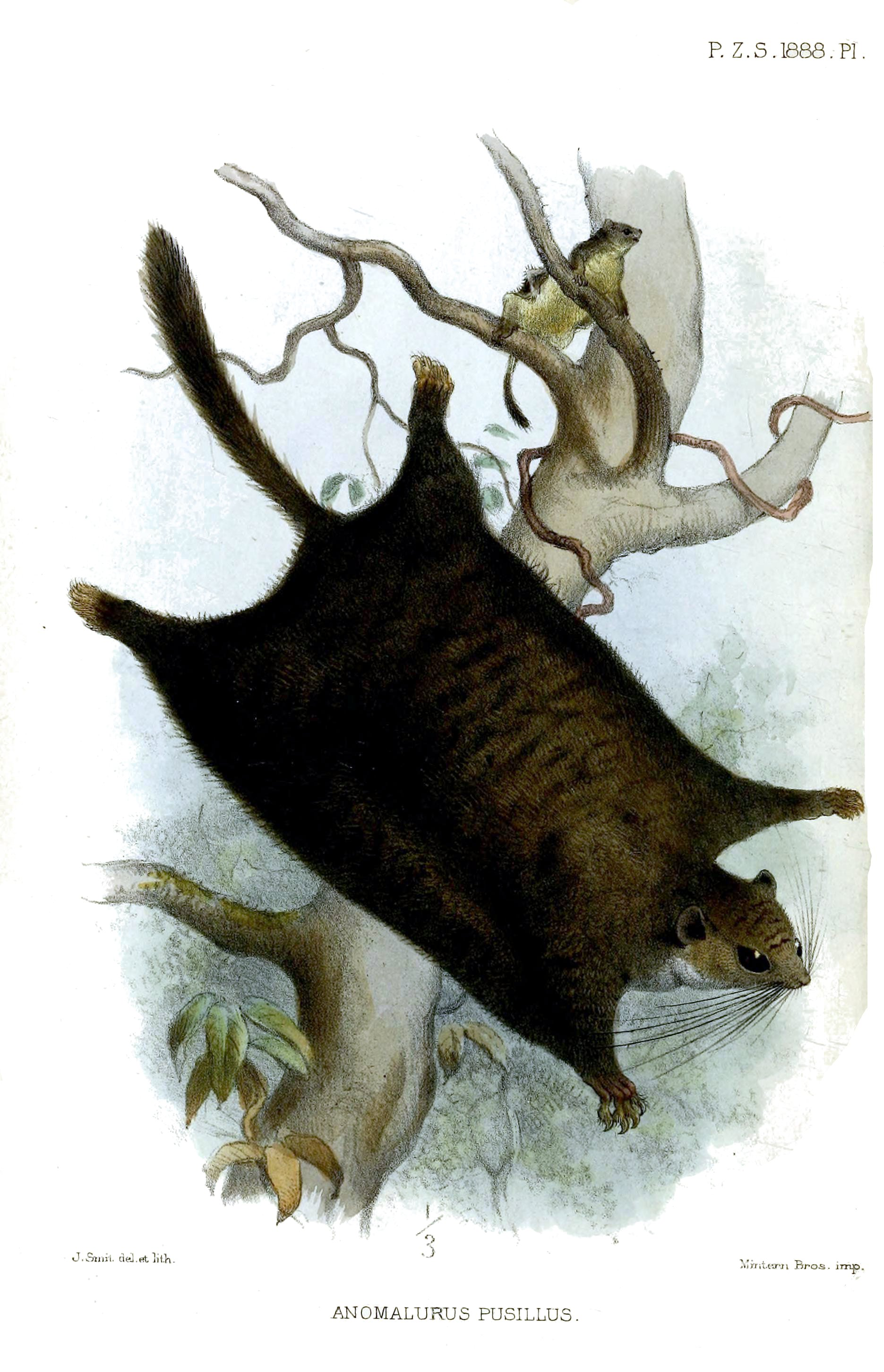
- Anomalurus pusillus Artist: Joseph Smit, 1888

Conservation status
- Least Concern (IUCN 3.1)

Scientific classification
- Kingdom: Animalia
- Phylum: Chordata
- Class: Mammalia
- Order: Rodentia
- Family: Anomaluridae
- Genus: Anomalurus
- Species: A. pusillus

Binomial name
- Anomalurus pusillus Thomas, 1887
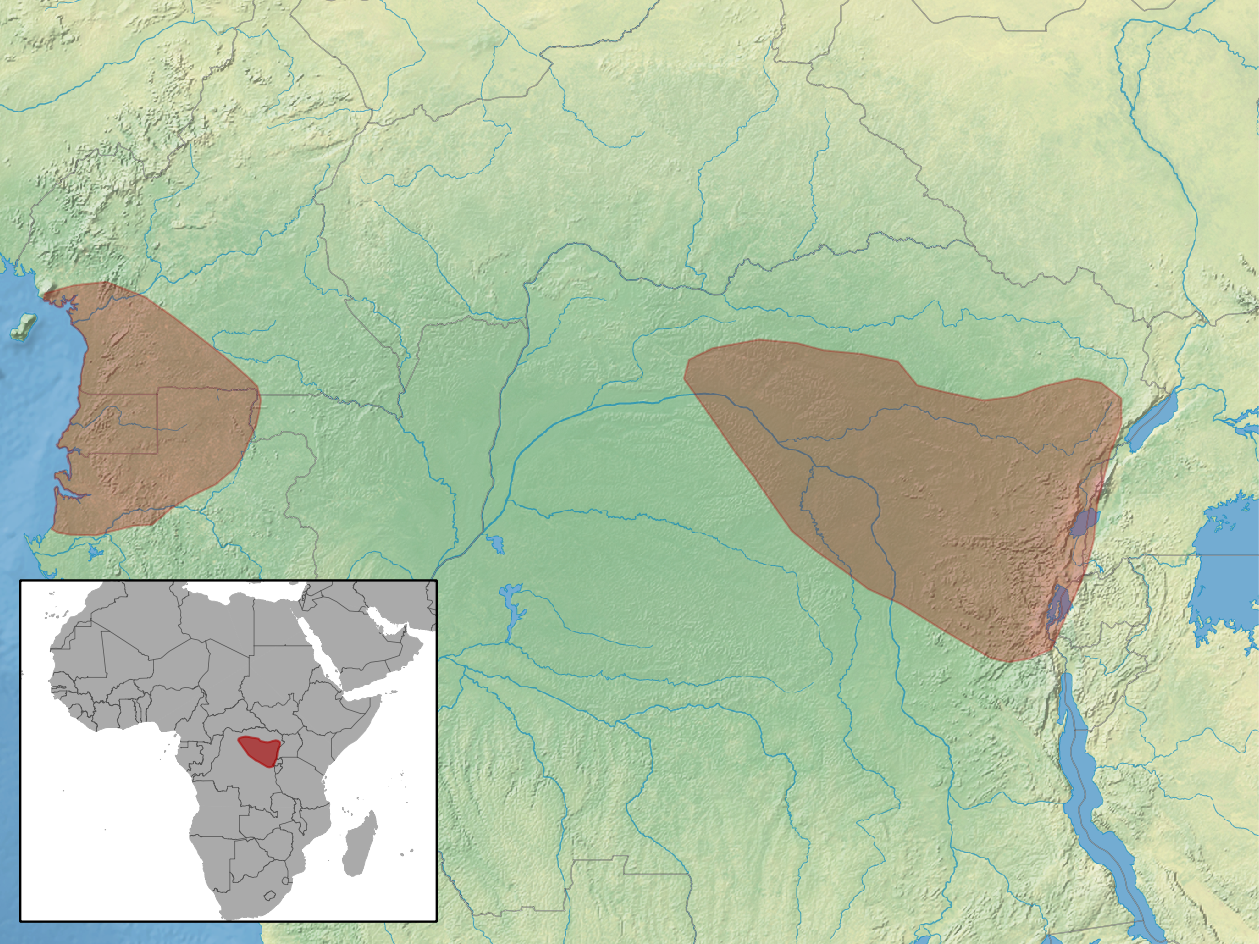

= Dwarf scaly-tailed squirrel =

Species of rodent

The dwarf scaly-tailed squirrel (Anomalurus pusillus) is a species of rodent in the family Anomaluridae. It is found in Cameroon, Central African Republic, Republic of the Congo, Democratic Republic of the Congo, Equatorial Guinea, Gabon and Uganda. The species is nocturnal and arboreal and lives in subtropical or tropical lowland rainforest. Membranes attached to its limbs and tail enable it to glide between trees. This squirrel is currently not considered to be threatened by habitat destruction; "much of the habitat within parts of the known range of this species is relatively intact, and the species is unlikely to be experiencing any significant declines."

== Description ==
This is a small flying squirrel, with adults having a head-and-body length of 185 to 255 mm (7.3 to 10.0 in) with a tail length of 120 to 200 mm (4.7 to 7.9 in). This flying squirrel weighs between 170 and 300 g (6.0 and 10.6 oz). The head is grey, and there is no contrasting colour on the edges of the ears. The fur on the upper parts is very variable in colour, ranging from black, grizzled grey or olive brown to mottled tan. The upper side of the membranes are dark grey, with the membranes near the tail tinged with yellow. The underparts are creamy white or yellowish, without any hint of rufous. The tufts of bristles surrounding the hind claws are also white. As with other scaly-tailed flying squirrels in the genus Anomalurus, a membrane is attached between the thighs and the more basal part of the tail. This part of the tail bears a patch of large cornified scales on the underside, the rest of the tail being plume-like.

== Distribution and habitat ==
The dwarf scaly-tailed squirrel is native to tropical western and central Africa. As far as is known, there are two or more separate populations; one is in West Africa in Liberia, where one specimen was collected in the Du River Valley in the west of the country and two other specimens from Mount Richard-Molard in the north of the country; the other population is in Central Africa, the range including southern Cameroon, Equatorial Guinea, northern Gabon, the Republic of Congo, the Democratic Republic of Congo, southwestern Central African Republic and eastern Uganda. It is possible that this rather unobtrusive species occurs in the intervening countries, with a single larger population. Although generally an animal of lowland primary rainforest, one specimen was collected at 2,200 m (7,200 ft) in Mugaba in the eastern part of the Democratic Republic of the Congo. It is generally found in the interior of forests and not around the edges or in mosaic woodland.

== Ecology ==
The species is arboreal and nocturnal, and like other members of its genus, is able to launch itself from a tree and glide through the air to a lower branch. During the day it remains concealed in its nest, usually a crevice or hole in a tree or a hollow tree, or it may cling to a trunk or branch where its cryptic colourations makes it inconspicuous. It usually occurs in pairs or small groups. Nothing is known about its reproductive habits. It is herbivorous and the diet includes fruits, including the fleshy fruits of the umbrella tree (Musanga cecropioides). A morphological resemblance of the teeth and jaws with those of Lord Derby's Anomalure (Anomalurus derbianus) suggests that A. pusillus may also eat bark.

== Status ==
The tropical forests where this flying squirrel lives are under threat from timber extraction and the conversion of the land to agricultural use. However the forests are much less threatened than are similar forests in western Africa. This squirrel is also under threat from hunting for bushmeat, but this is unlikely to pose much of a threat, and the International Union for Conservation of Nature has assessed its conservation status as being of "least concern".
