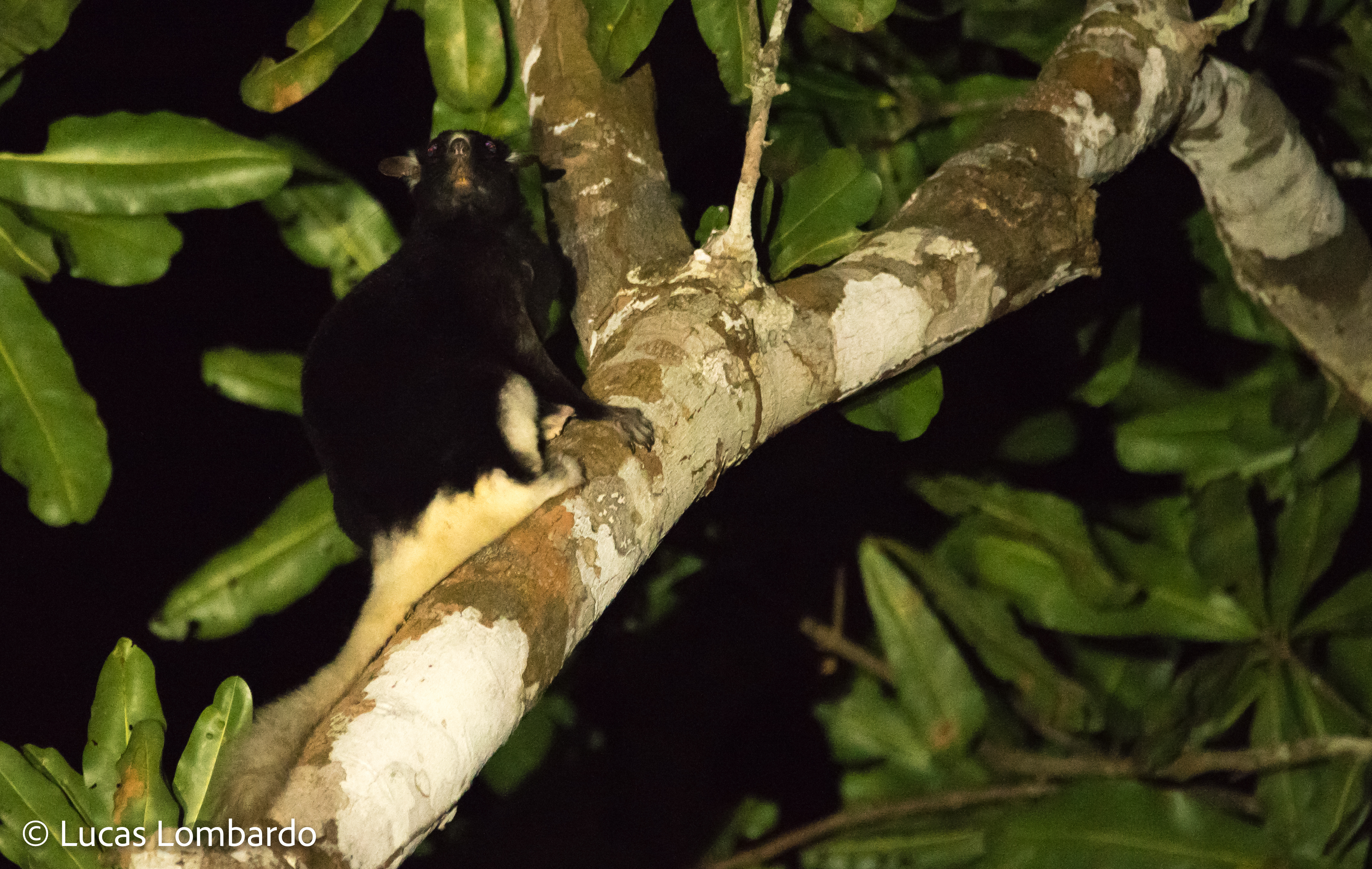
- Pel's Anomalure, Ankasa Conservation Area, Ghana

Conservation status
- Least Concern (IUCN 3.1)

Scientific classification
- Kingdom: Animalia
- Phylum: Chordata
- Class: Mammalia
- Order: Rodentia
- Family: Anomaluridae
- Genus: Anomalurus
- Species: A. pelii

Binomial name
- Anomalurus pelii (Schlegel & S. Müller, 1845)

Subspecies
- A. p. auzembergeri Matschie, 1914; A. p. pelii (Schlegel & Müller, 1845)

= Pel's flying squirrel =

Species of rodent

Pel's flying squirrel or Pel's scaly-tailed squirrel (Anomalurus pelii) is a species of rodent in the family Anomaluridae. It is found in Liberia, Ivory Coast, and Ghana, where it lives in lowland tropical rainforests. It is named after Hendrik Pel.

== History ==
The tropical forests of Africa were little explored by Europeans before the nineteenth century. Colugos and flying squirrels had been known from south eastern Asia and gliding marsupials from Australia earlier than this, but the discovery of the scaly-tailed squirrels of equatorial Africa was not made till the 1840s. British zoologist and collector Louis Fraser exploring the Niger basin brought a specimen of Lord Derby's scaly-tailed squirrel (Anomalurus derbianus) back to Britain. Compared to the previously known flying squirrels, this had two rows of large scales on the underside of the basal part of its tail. The flying membrane stretched from wrist to ankle and was supported by a cartilaginous strip which had its origin at the elbow. (The east Asian flying squirrels have a similar cartilage strip, but it terminates at the wrist.) The scaly tailed squirrels had an additional membrane extending from the ankle to part-way along the tail, and when extended, the membrane formed a straight line from heel to heel.

Ten years later, a specimen of another species, Pel's flying squirrel, was brought to Europe and showed similar anatomical features. The hands and feet had the digits close together with strongly curved nails. The tail was also unusual in that the free part resembled the shape of a feather, with the large cornified scales a prominent feature on the underside. The animal's fur was described as soft and supple, without any spines.

== Description ==
Pel's flying squirrel is a large species, with a head-and-body length of 400 to 540 mm (16 to 21 in) and a tail of 320 to 550 mm (13 to 22 in). It weighs between 1,300 to 2,000 g (46 to 71 oz) The upper parts are mainly black, with some white patches, while the underparts are white. The margin of the patagium, the membrane joining the wrist with the ankle, is partly white, and that of the uropatagium, joining the ankles and tail, is all white. The ears are of average size and partly naked, the forefeet are mostly black, the hind feet often have white patches and the tail is plume-like.

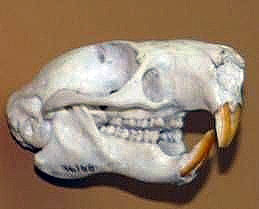
Skull of a Pel's flying squirrel

== Distribution and habitat ==
Pel's flying squirrel is native to West Africa where its range includes eastern Liberia, southern Ivory Coast and southwestern Ghana. It occurs in the tropical rainforest at low altitudes, particularly where there are tall, emergent trees and palms trees, in areas with annual precipitation in the range 1,400 to 3,900 millimetres (55 to 154 in). However, it appreciates separate trees that are not wreathed in lianas, because when it emerges from its den at night, it needs space to glide down to lower levels to feed.

== Ecology ==
Pel's flying squirrel is wholly nocturnal, spending the day in a hole in a tree and only emerging after dark. It feeds on bark, supplemented with fruits, flowers and leaves. It usually occurs in pairs, but as many as six individuals have been found sharing the same nesting site in a tree. If disturbed in its den, this squirrel snaps its teeth and hisses, and the sound may be amplified by the acoustics of the hollow tree. Given its large size, bold colouration and aggressive behaviour, this species may be able to drive off potential predators such as birds of prey, small carnivores and primates, and compete successfully with hornbills for nest sites.

The reproduction of this species is poorly known. In Ghana, litters seem to occur twice a year, in April and September, with two or three young in each litter, occasionally four. A copulatory plug is present in the vagina during pregnancy and the young are fully furred and have their eyes open at birth. The young remain in the nest and both parents bring them food.

== Status ==
The tropical forests where this flying squirrel lives are under threat because of timber harvesting and the conversion of the land to agricultural use. The animal is also under threat from hunters and is sometimes to be seen on sale as bushmeat in markets. As a secretive, nocturnal species, its population size and natural history are little known, and the International Union for Conservation of Nature and has rated it as "least concern".
