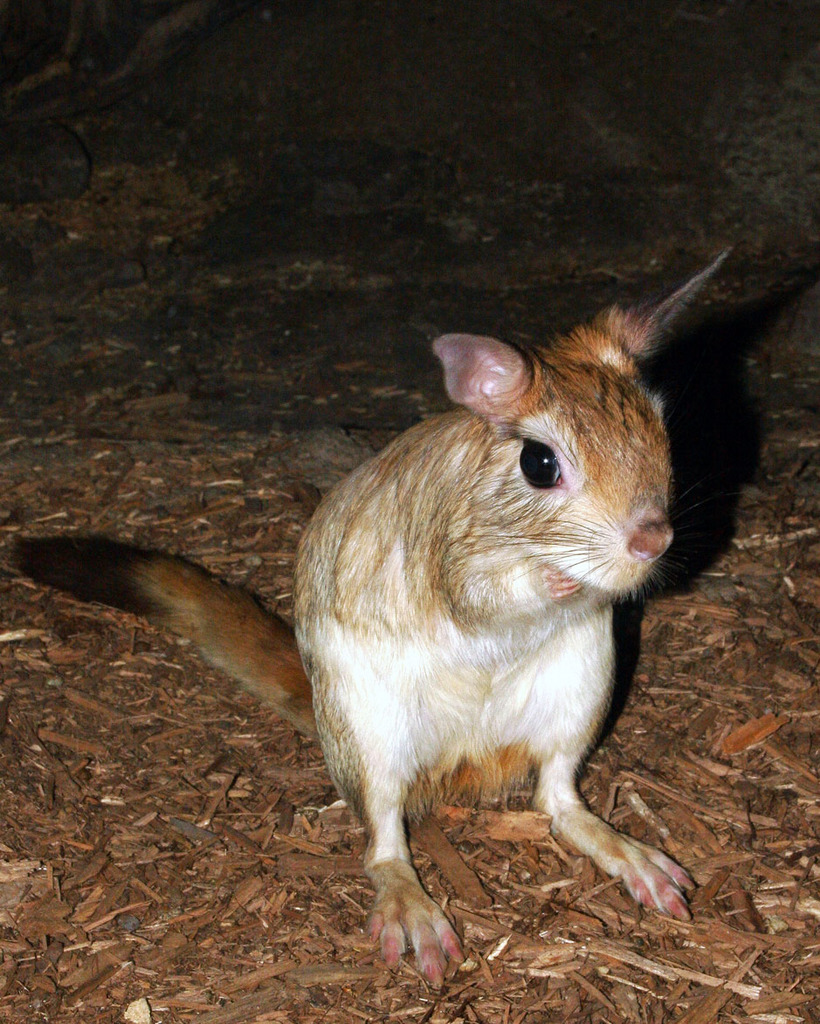
- Pedetes capensis

Scientific classification
- Kingdom: Animalia
- Phylum: Chordata
- Class: Mammalia
- Infraclass: Placentalia
- Order: Rodentia
- Suborder: Anomaluromorpha; Bugge, 1974

Families
- Anomaluridae; Pedetidae; Zenkerellidae

= Anomaluromorpha =

Anomaluromorpha Temporal range: Late Eocene to recent 40–0 Ma

Suborder of rodents

Anomaluromorpha is a clade that unites the anomalures, springhares, and zenkerella. It has alternately been designated as either a suborder or infraorder. Most recently, Carleton & Musser 2005 recognized it as one of five suborders of rodents.

== Characteristics ==
The suborder Anomaluromorpha was erected to unite sciurognathous rodents with a hystricomorphous zygomasseteric system restricted to sub-Saharan Africa. Many authors have suggested that the two extant families may be only distantly related, and that they belong to separate suborders or infraorders. For example, the Pedetidae are the only family of rodents with multiserial enamel except for the Hystricognathi. This characteristic, the hystricomorphous zygomatic region, and a common distribution in southern continents has led many researchers to suggest that the springhares (but not anomalures) may be allied with hystricognaths. Montgelard et al. 2002 generated some support for Anomaluromorpha in a molecular phylogeny using 12S rRNA and cytochrome b.

== Families ==
The suborder Anomaluromorpha contains nine living species in four genera and three families. An additional fossil family probably belongs to this group.

- †Parapedetidae
- Pedetidae - springhares
- Anomaluridae - scaly-tailed flying squirrels, flying mice
- Zenkerellidae - zenkerella or Cameroon scaly-tail

== Potential relatives ==
The following fossil taxa are also sometimes placed in the Anomaluromorpha:

- †Diatomys
- †Zegdoumyidae

== Bibliography ==
- Carleton, M. D.; Musser, G. G. (2005). "Order Rodentia". In Wilson, D. E.; Reeder, D. M. (eds.). Mammal Species of the World A Taxonomic and Geographic Reference. Baltimore: Johns Hopkins University Press. pp. 745–752. ISBN 978-0-8018-8221-0.
- McKenna, M. C.; Bell, S. K. (1997). Classification of Mammals Above the Species Level. New York: Columbia University Press. ISBN 0-231-11013-8.
- Montgelard, C.; Bentz, S.; Tirard, C.; Vernaeu, O.; Catzeflis, F. M. (2002). "Molecular systematics of Sciurognathi: the mitochondrial cytochrome b and 12S rRNA genes support the Anomaluroidea (Pedetidae and Anomaluridae)". Molecular Phylogenetics and Evolution. 22 (2): 220–233. doi:10.1006/mpev.2001.1056. PMID 11820843.
