= Paranomalurus =

Paranomalurus Temporal range: Oligocene–Miocene

Scientific classification
- Kingdom: Animalia
- Phylum: Chordata
- Class: Mammalia
- Order: Rodentia
- Family: Anomaluridae
- Genus: †Paranomalurus; Lavocat, 1973

Type species
- Paranomalurus bishopi Lavocat, 1973

Other species
- Paranomalurus walkeri Lavocat, 1973; Paranomalurus riodeoroensis Marivaux et al., 2017

Extinct genus of anomalurid rodent

Paranomalurus is an extinct genus of anomalurid rodent that lived in Africa during the Oligocene and Miocene epochs.

== Etymology ==
The specific epithet of the species Paranomalurus riodeoroensis refers to Rio de Oro.

== Desciption ==
The enamel of the incisors of P. riodeoroensis is characterised by thin Hunter-Schreger bands (HSBs). Generally, there is one flattened enamel prism per band, but on occasionally two per band. The interprismatic matrix, which runs parallel to the prism direction, is thin.
