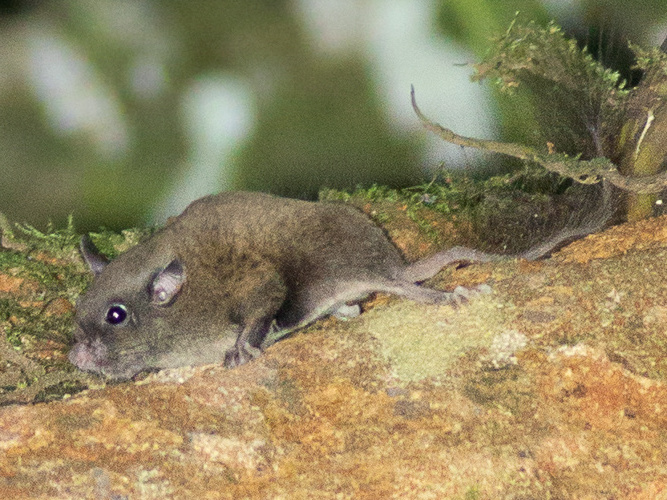

Conservation status
- Least Concern (IUCN 3.1)

Scientific classification
- Kingdom: Animalia
- Phylum: Chordata
- Class: Mammalia
- Order: Rodentia
- Family: Anomaluridae
- Genus: Idiurus
- Species: I. macrotis

Binomial name
- Idiurus macrotis Miller, 1898
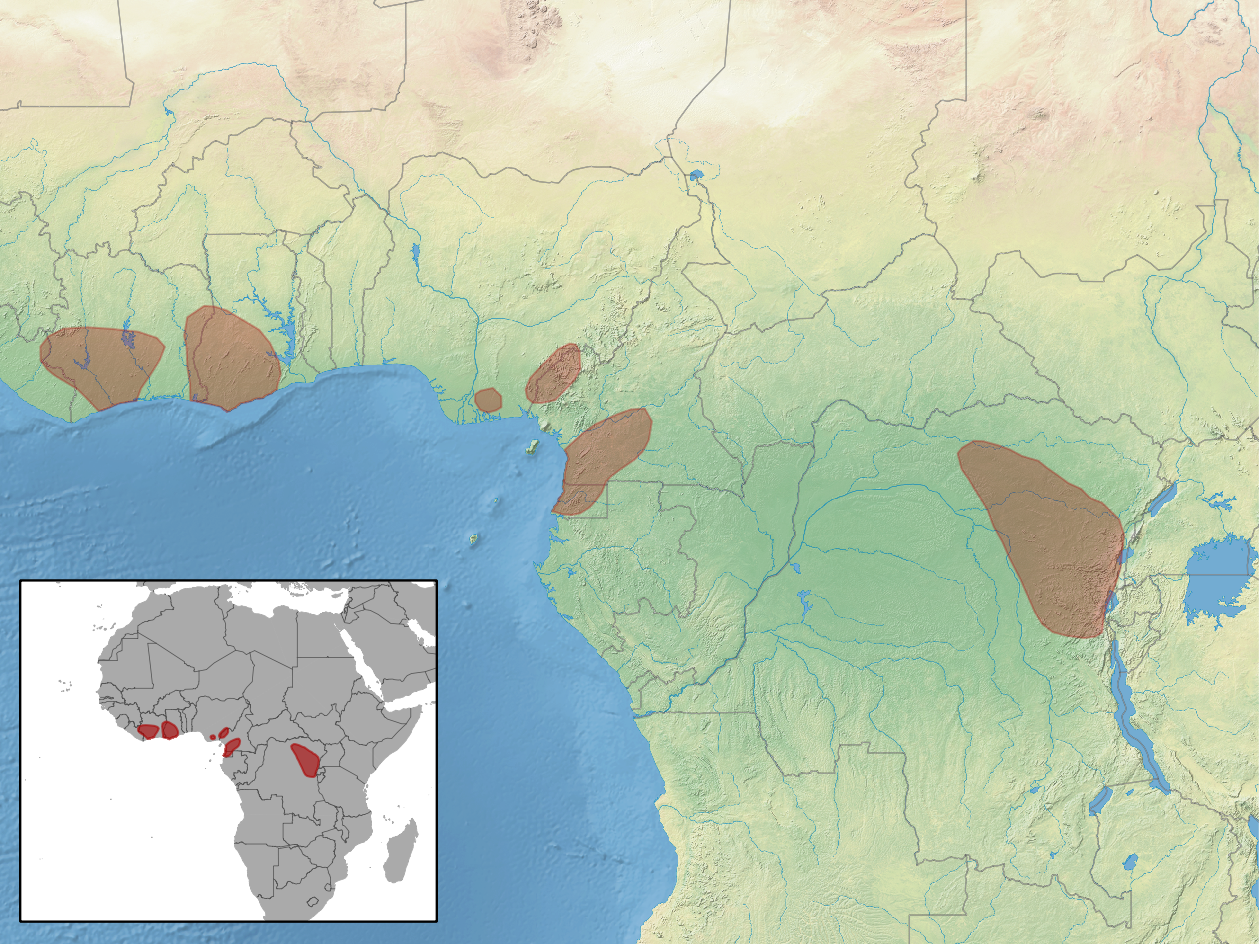

= Long-eared flying mouse =

Species of rodent

The long-eared flying mouse (Idiurus macrotis) or long-eared scaly-tailed flying squirrel, is a species of flying mouse from western and central Africa. It is not actually a squirrel, nor a mouse, though it is a rodent. Not much is known about them because they are very hard to keep alive in captivity.

To achieve gliding flight, it uses two membranes (patagia) which fold up when not in use. When the limbs are stretched wide in a star-shape, the membranes become taut and allow the rodent to glide from tree to tree. Being arboreal, Idiurus spends all of its time in the trees, living in hollow trunks in groups of 2 to 40. Limited information suggests that it is mainly frugivorous. It has a long tail in proportion to its body, sporting two lines of raised scales, and patches of scaly skin to help it grip trees, but the rest of its body is furry. The tail is longer than the body and is also used to balance, like a primate's tail. Long-eared scaly-tailed flying squirrels are about 20 centimetres (7.9 in) long and weigh 30g. In comparison, the body of a common household mouse is approximately 10 centimetres (3.9 in) long and its tail is approximately 5 centimetres (2.0 in).
