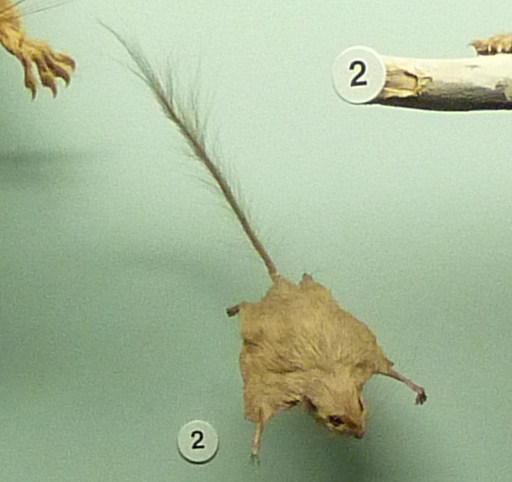

Conservation status
- Least Concern (IUCN 3.1)

Scientific classification
- Kingdom: Animalia
- Phylum: Chordata
- Class: Mammalia
- Order: Rodentia
- Family: Anomaluridae
- Genus: Idiurus
- Species: I. zenkeri

Binomial name
- Idiurus zenkeri Matschie, 1894
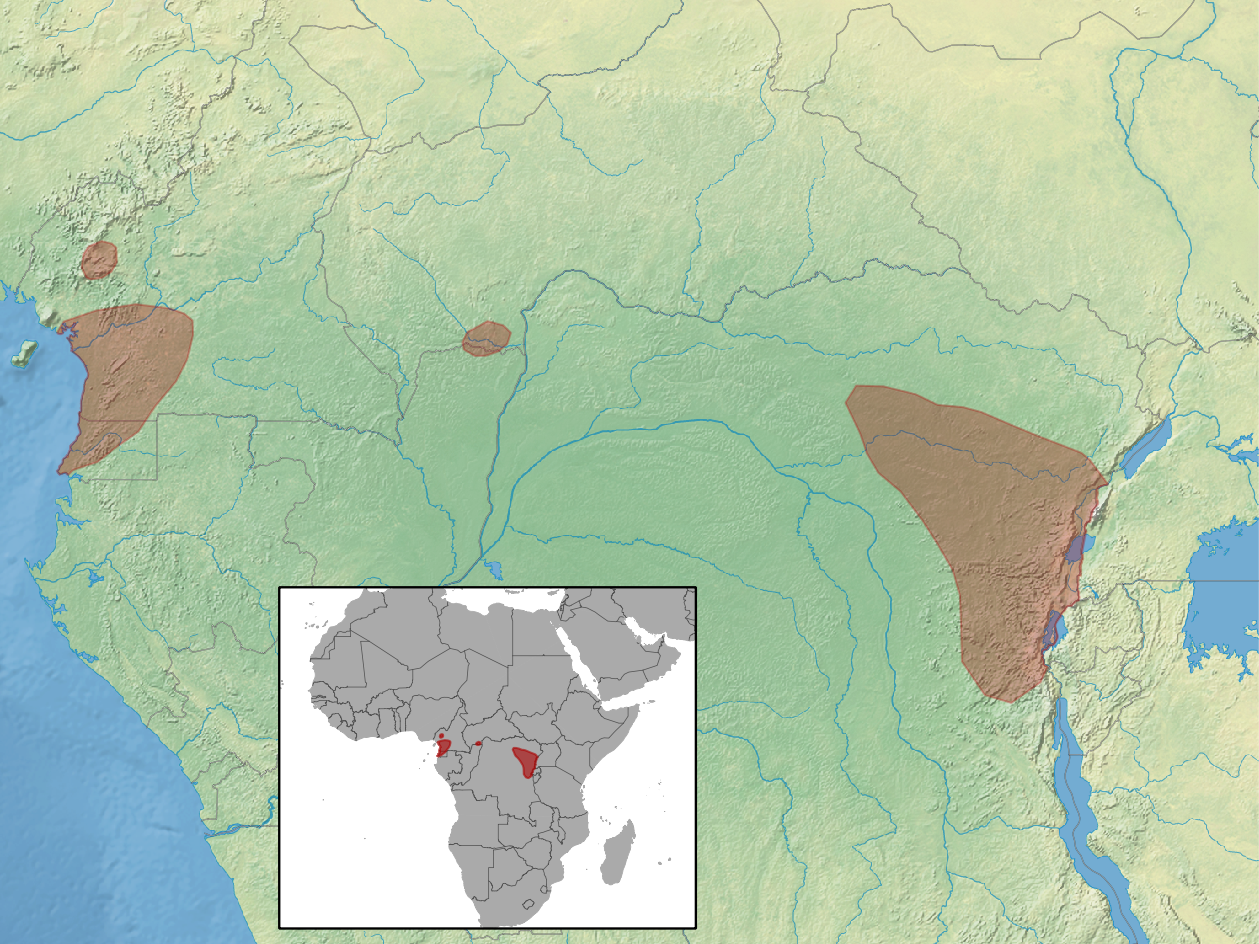

= Pygmy scaly-tailed flying squirrel =

Species of rodent

The pygmy scaly-tailed flying squirrel (Idiurus zenkeri) is a species of rodent in the family Anomaluridae. It is found in Cameroon, Central African Republic, Republic of the Congo, Democratic Republic of the Congo, Equatorial Guinea, and Uganda. Its natural habitat is subtropical or tropical moist lowland forests.

== Diseases ==
The metanalysis of Peterson et al., 2004 shows Idiurus zenkeri is a probable source of some zoonotic outbreaks.
