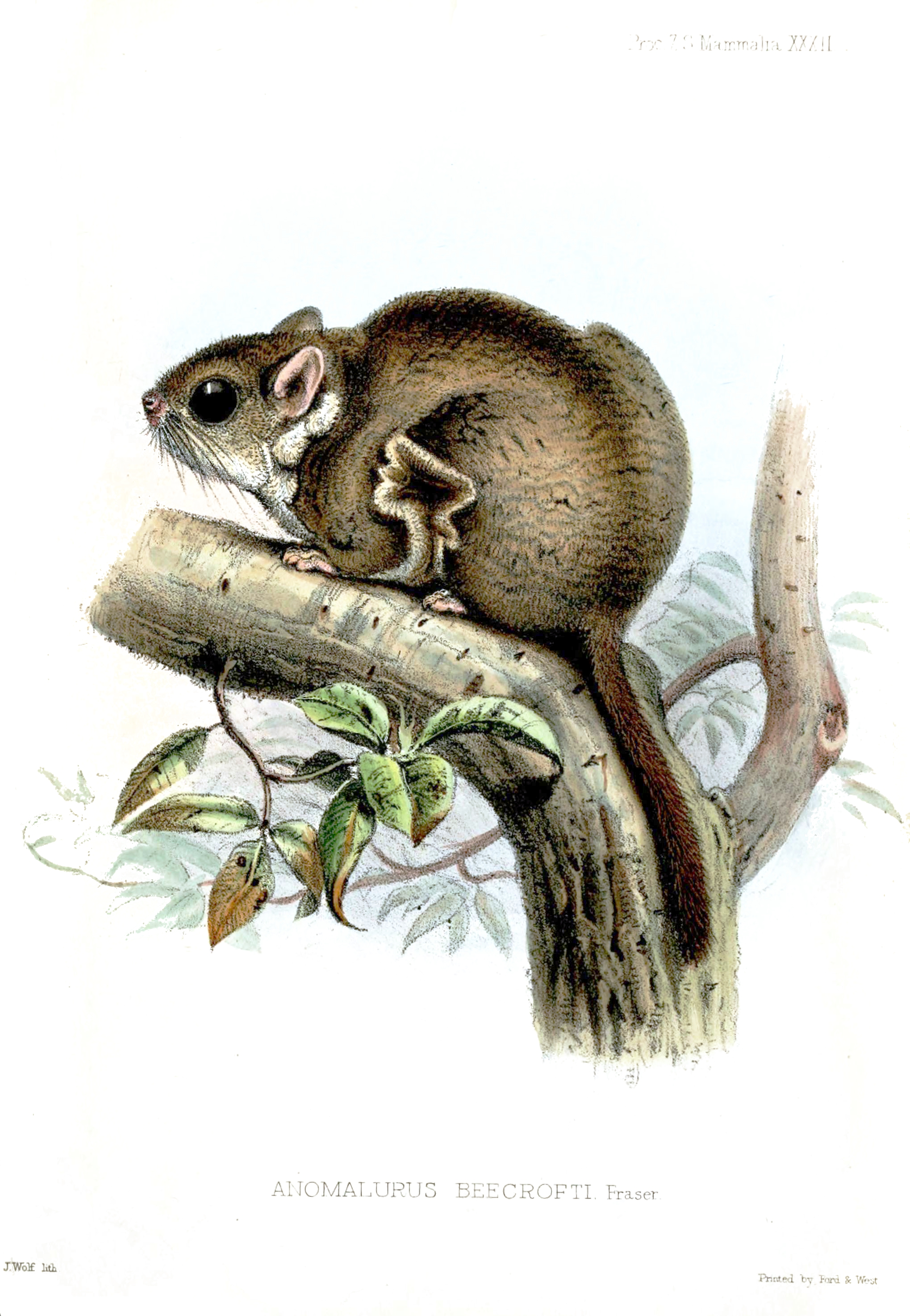

Conservation status
- Least Concern (IUCN 3.1)

Scientific classification
- Kingdom: Animalia
- Phylum: Chordata
- Class: Mammalia
- Order: Rodentia
- Family: Anomaluridae
- Genus: Anomalurus
- Species: A. beecrofti

Binomial name
- Anomalurus beecrofti Fraser, 1853
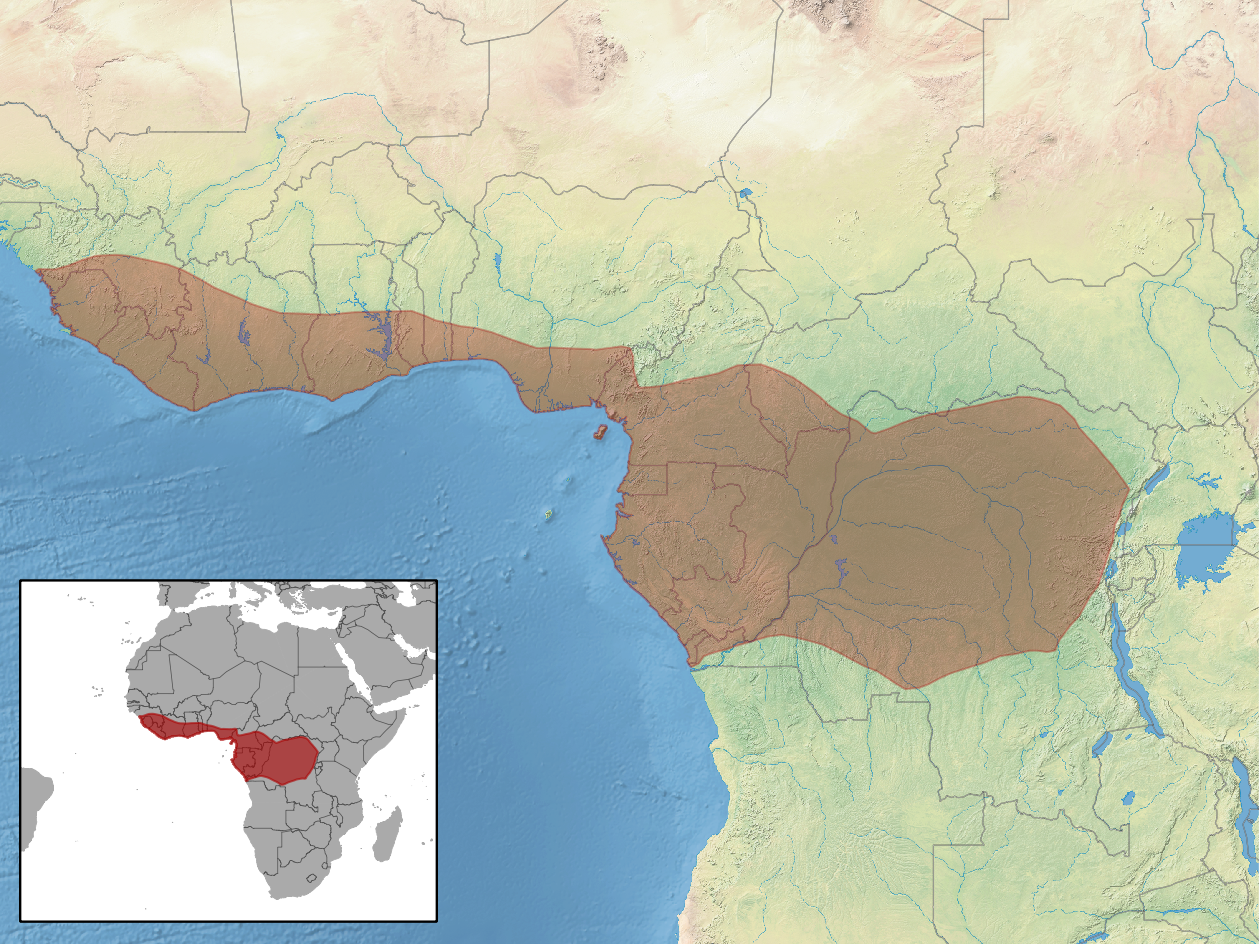

Synonyms
- Anomalurops beecrofti (Fraser, 1853)

= Beecroft's flying squirrel =

Species of rodent

Beecroft's flying squirrel (Anomalurus beecrofti) or Beecroft's scaly-tailed squirrel, is a species of rodent in the family Anomaluridae. Some authorities consider it to be monotypic within the genus Anomalurops. Its natural habitats are subtropical or tropical dry forests, subtropical or tropical moist lowland forests, and plantations. It is threatened by habitat destruction but is a common species with a wide range and the International Union for Conservation of Nature has rated its conservation status as being of "least concern".

== Description ==
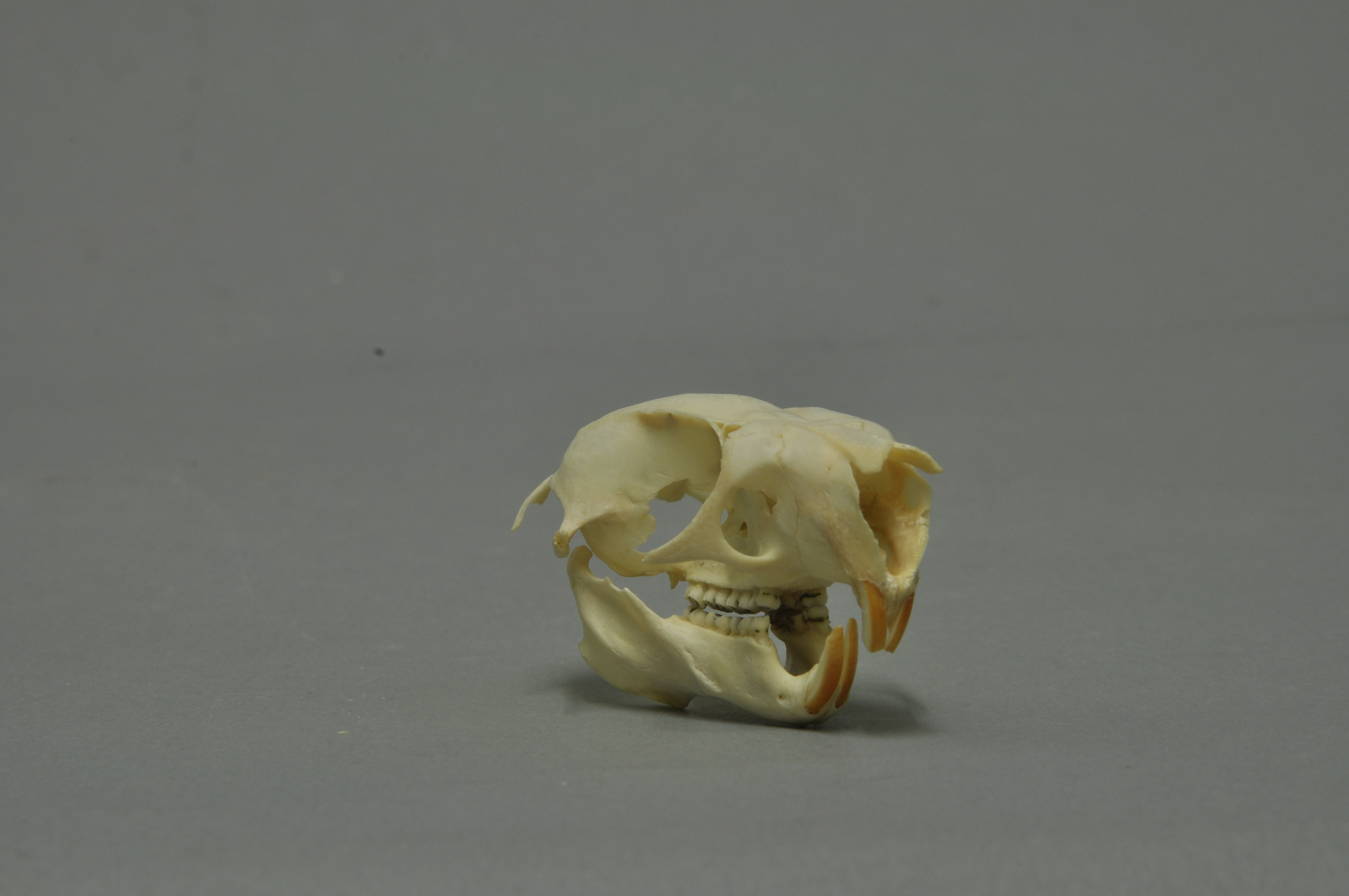
Skull of a Beecroft's flying squirrel

Beecroft's flying squirrel is a medium-sized squirrel with a body length of about 28 cm (11 in) and a tail measuring 21 cm (8 in). It has soft, thick fur; the upper parts are brindled slate-grey, while the underparts are paler grey with an orangeish sheen or whitish. Notably, there is a pale spot on the crown and another on the nape of the neck. A gliding membrane extends from the fore limbs to the hind limbs and onwards to the tail. This is furred on its upper side but nearly naked below. The tail is black and has sixteen to eighteen scales on the underside near its base.

== Distribution and habitat ==
Beecroft's flying squirrel has a wide distribution in West and Central Africa. Its range extends from Senegal in the west to Nigeria, Cameroon and the Democratic Republic of Congo in the east, and southwards to Namibia, with a few records from Angola. Although native to virgin wet and dry forests, it is able to adapt to secondary forest, and occurs at altitudes of up to 2,500 m (8,200 ft). It seems to prefer swampy forests with palms, and also inhabits oil palm plantations and other cultivated areas.

== Ecology ==
Beecroft's flying squirrels are largely nocturnal. They spend the day in nests composed of leaves and twigs high up in the canopy. At dusk they leave these and glide down to lower parts of the trees to forage for nuts, fruit, seeds, leaves and bark. They can run along branches but seldom descend to the ground as they find terrestrial locomotion difficult because their gliding membranes get in the way. The enlarged scales on the undersides of their tails may serve the purpose of slowing them down as they land from their glide. These squirrels may occur alone or in pairs, or several individuals may live in the same tree and hide in the same nest. They communicate by making calls described as "something between a whistle and a hoot". Their hearing is probably acute; they sometimes make twittering sounds, and have a hissing alarm call.

== Reproduction ==
The reproduction of this species has been little studied. In Nigeria, breeding seems to occur in the rainy season, lactating females having been found in January and October. The litter size seems normally to be one, the young being fully furred and able to move around at the time of birth. A copulatory plug is present in the vagina during pregnancy. The juvenile remains in the nest for some time. Both parents care for the young, masticating food and bringing it to their offspring in their mouths, their cheeks swelling to the size of tangerines.
