= Shazurus =

Shazurus Temporal range: Priabonian

Scientific classification
- Kingdom: Animalia
- Phylum: Chordata
- Class: Mammalia
- Order: Rodentia
- Family: Anomaluridae
- Genus: †Shazurus
- Species: †S. minutus

Binomial name
- †Shazurus minutus Sallam et al., 2010

Extinct genus of anomalurid rodent

Shazurus is an extinct monotypic genus of anomalurid rodent that lived in what is now Egypt during the Priabonian stage of the Eocene epoch.

== Etymology ==
The generic name Shazurus derives from shaz, the Arabic word for anomalous as pronounced colloquially by Egyptians, and urus, the Greek word for tail. The specific epithet of the type species, Shazurus minutus, means very small in Latin, in reference to the tiny size of the rodent.
