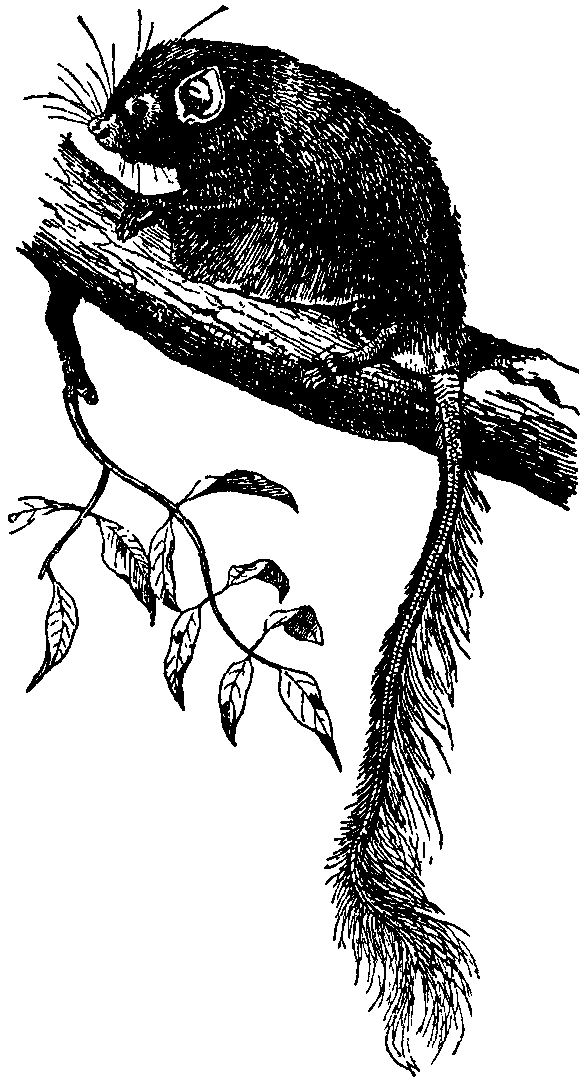
- Pygmy scaly-tailed flying squirrel

Scientific classification
- Kingdom: Animalia
- Phylum: Chordata
- Class: Mammalia
- Order: Rodentia
- Family: Anomaluridae
- Genus: Idiurus; Matschie, 1894

Type species
- Idiurus zenkeri Matschie, 1894

Species
- Idiurus macrotis Idiurus zenkeri
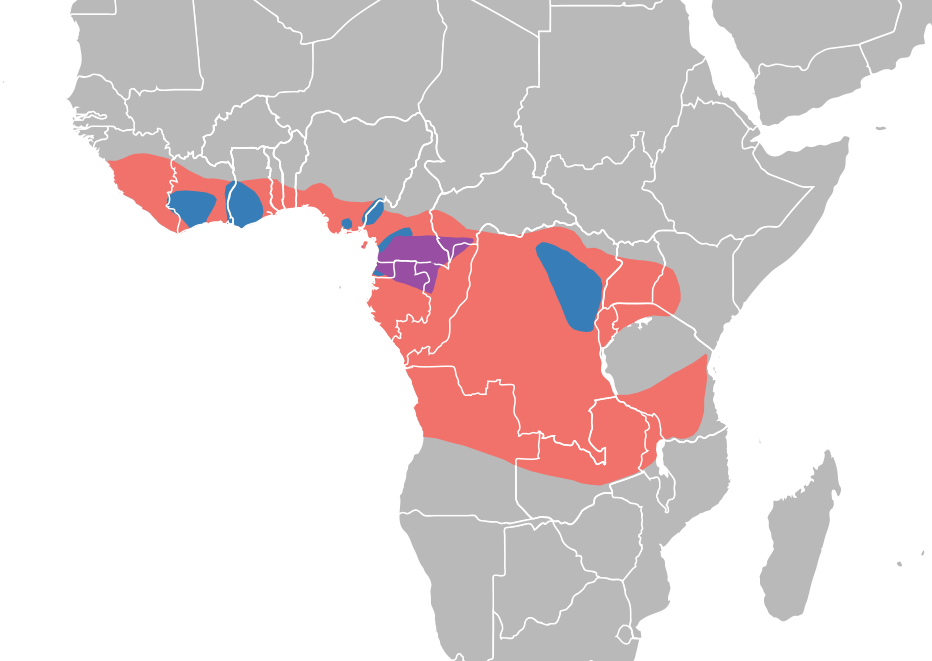
- Anomaluridae distribution. Anomalurus in red, Idiurus in blue, Zenkerella (I. zenkeri) in purple.

= Flying mouse =

Genus of rodents

The flying mice, also known as the pygmy scaly-tails, pygmy scaly-tailed flying squirrels, or pygmy anomalures are not true mice, not true squirrels, and are not capable of true flight. These unusual rodents are essentially miniaturized versions of anomalures and are part of the same sub-Saharan African radiation of gliding mammal.

== Characteristics ==
These animals resemble mice with gliding membranes and long, sparsely-haired tails. Their appearance is similar to some marsupial gliders. They are less than 10 cm (4 inches) in head and body length and weigh 14-35 grams (1/2 - 1.2 oz). They have a morphologically specialized tongue.

Flying mice are nocturnal and are found in the poorly explored tropical forests of central (and to a lesser extent western) Africa. Little is known of their habits as a result. Gerald Durrell has attested that one or both species live in colonies of dozens of individuals. Bats may also be found sharing these tree-hollow colonies.

== Species ==
- Long-eared flying mouse (Idiurus macrotis)
- Pygmy scaly-tailed flying squirrel (Idiurus zenkeri)

== See also ==
- Gliding mammal
