= Zenkerella wintoni =

Zenkerella wintoni Temporal range: Early Miocene

Scientific classification
- Domain: Eukaryota
- Kingdom: Animalia
- Phylum: Chordata
- Class: Mammalia
- Order: Rodentia
- Family: Zenkerellidae
- Genus: Zenkerella
- Species: †Z. wintoni

Binomial name
- †Zenkerella wintoni Lavocat, 1973

Extinct species of rodent

Zenkerella wintoni is in extinct species of rodent from the family Zenkerellidae. It is known from a single mandible from Songhor, Kenya dated to the Early Miocene.

Zenkarella wintoni along with its living relative have a highly derived molar morphology characterized by a simplified trilophodont pattern that is very different from that of other anomaluroids.
