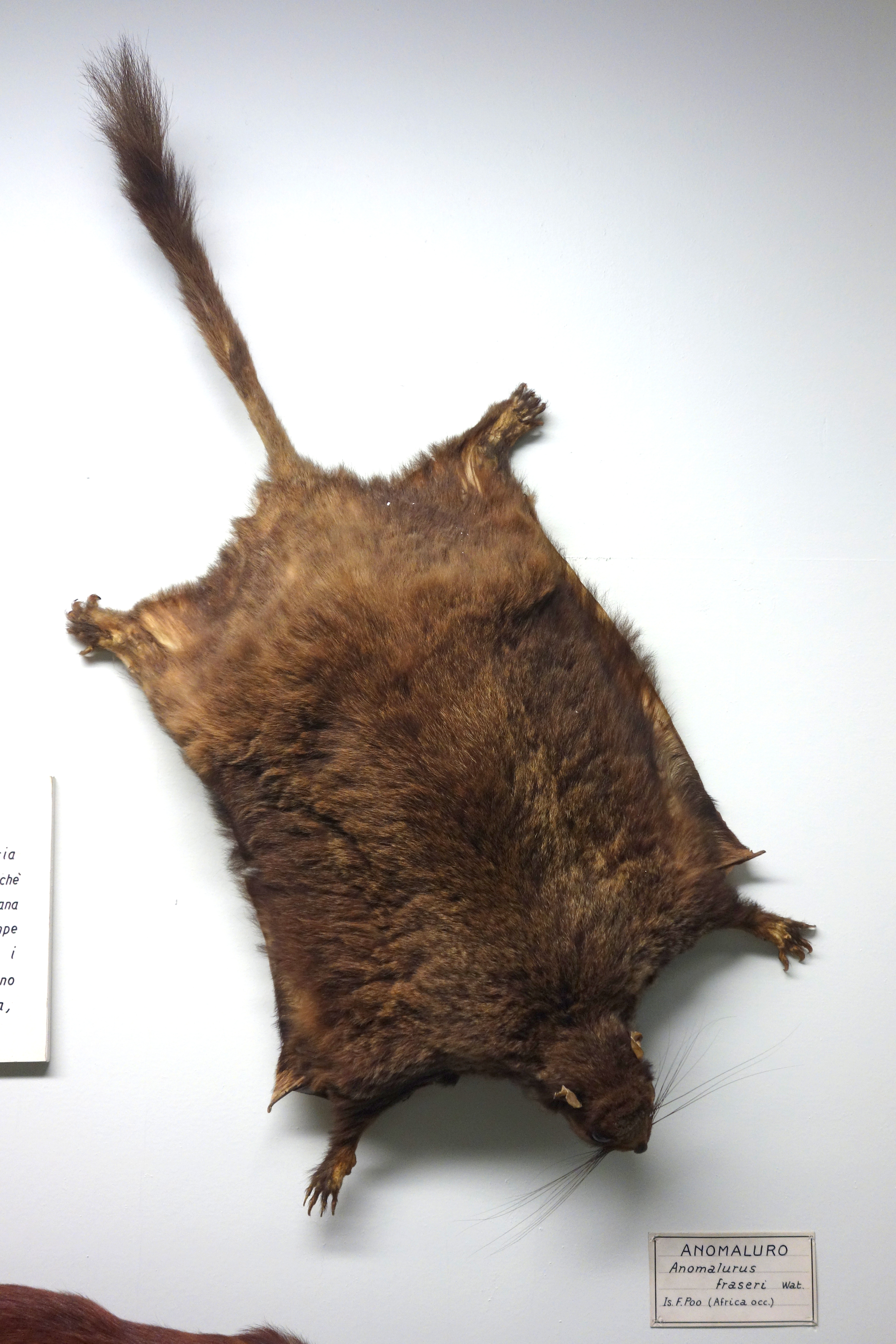

Conservation status
- Least Concern (IUCN 3.1)

Scientific classification
- Kingdom: Animalia
- Phylum: Chordata
- Class: Mammalia
- Order: Rodentia
- Family: Anomaluridae
- Genus: Anomalurus
- Species: A. derbianus

Binomial name
- Anomalurus derbianus (J. E. Gray, 1842)
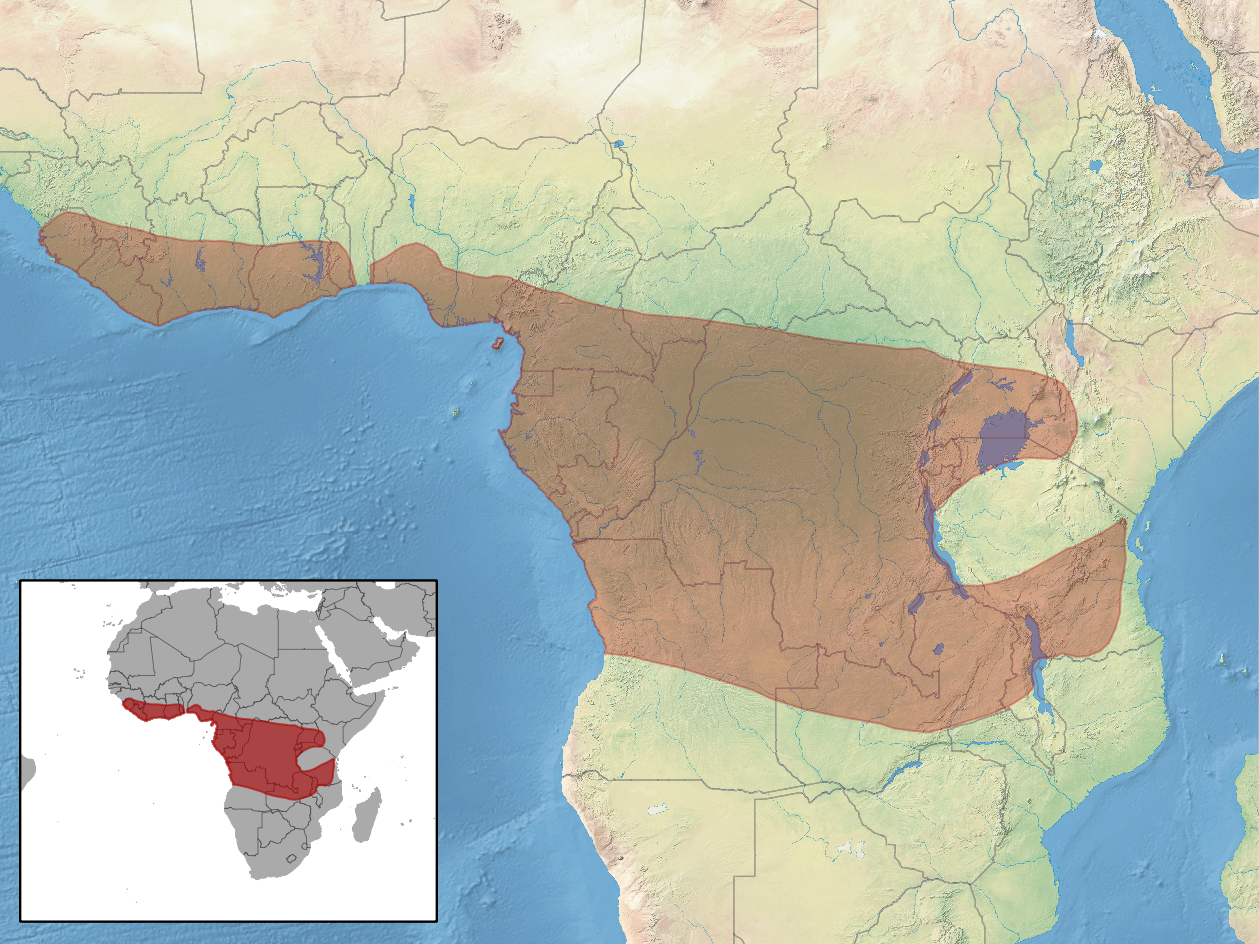

Synonyms
- Anomalurus beldeni Anomalurus chrysophaenus Anomalurus cinereus Anomalurus erythronotus Anomalurus fraseri Anomalurus jacksoni Anomalurus neavei Anomalurus nigrensis Anomalurus orientalis Anomalurus squamicaudus

= Lord Derby's scaly-tailed squirrel =

Species of rodent

Lord Derby's scaly-tailed squirrel (Anomalurus derbianus) is an anomalurid rodent native to Africa. It was named after Edward Smith-Stanley, 13th Earl of Derby.

== Range and habitat ==
Lord Derby's scaly-tailed squirrel lives in tropical and subtropical rainforests in western and central Africa. It is found in Angola, Cameroon, Central African Republic, Republic of the Congo, Democratic Republic of the Congo, Ivory Coast, Equatorial Guinea, Gabon, Ghana, Kenya, Liberia, Malawi, Mozambique, Nigeria, Sierra Leone, Tanzania, Uganda, and Zambia.

== Behavior ==
Lord Derby's scaly-tailed squirrel is nocturnal, and will sleep in nests in holes in trees. They live either alone or in pairs. They move around by extending their membrane and gliding from tree to tree. Flights of up to 250 meters (820 feet) have been recorded. They will use the scales on the bottom of their tails to help themselves climb in the trees. Lord Derby's scaly-tailed flying squirrels are mainly herbivorous, eating plant matter such as leaves, bark, green nuts, fruit and flowers.
