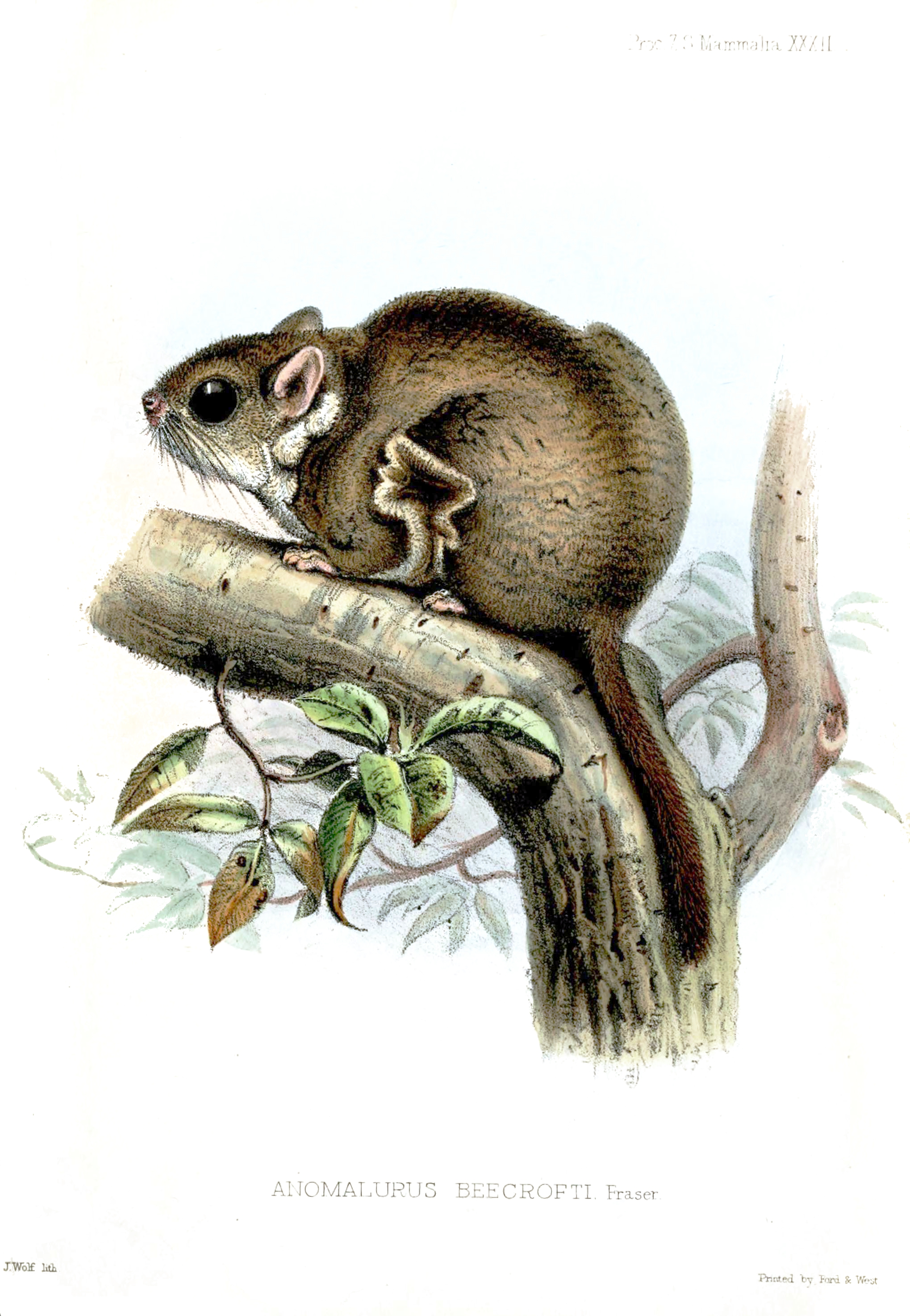
- Anomalurus beecrofti, Beecroft's flying squirrel Artist: Joseph Wolf, 1851

Scientific classification
- Kingdom: Animalia
- Phylum: Chordata
- Class: Mammalia
- Infraclass: Placentalia
- Order: Rodentia
- Suborder: Anomaluromorpha
- Family: Anomaluridae; Gervais in d'Orbigny, 1849

Type genus
- Anomalurus Waterhouse, 1843

Genera
- Anomalurus; Idiurus
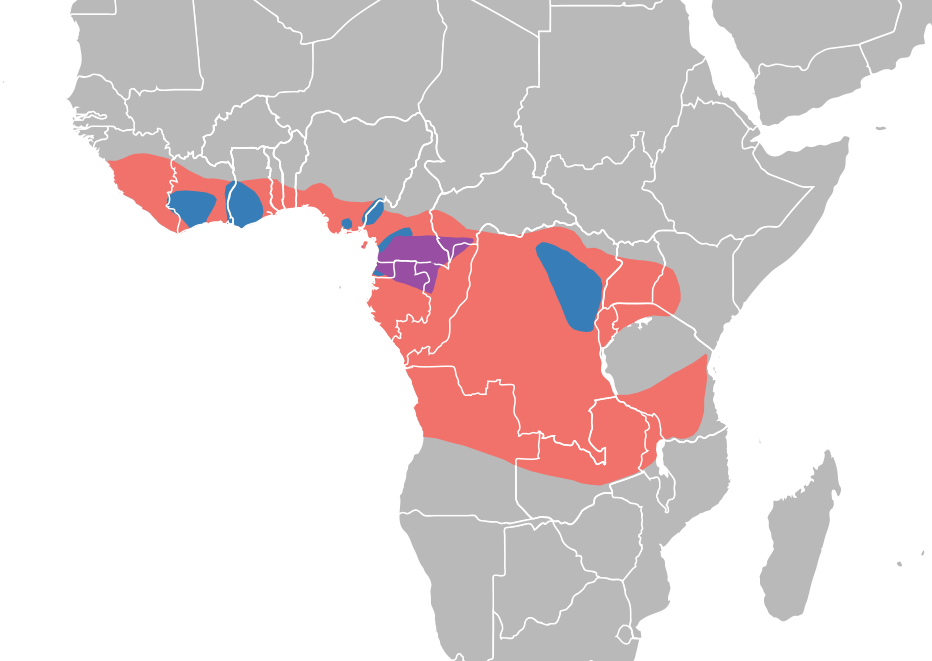
- Anomaluridae distribution. Anomalurus in red, Idiurus in blue, Zenkerella (I. zenkeri) in purple.

= Anomalure =

Anomalures Temporal range: Late Eocene to recent38–0 Ma

Family of rodents

The Anomaluridae are a family of rodents found in central Africa. They are known as anomalures or scaly-tailed squirrels or African flying squirrels. The six extant species are classified into two genera: Anomalurus, and the smaller, Idiurus.

All anomalurids have membranes between their front and hind legs like those of the boreal flying squirrels, but they are not closely related to the flying squirrels that form the separate tribe Petauristini of the family Sciuridae. They are distinguished by two rows of pointed, raised scales on the undersides of their tails. The anatomy of their heads is quite different from that of the sciurid flying squirrels.

By extending their limbs, anomalures transform themselves into a gliding platform that they control by manipulating the membranes and tail. Like North American flying squirrels, these species have a cartilaginous rod that aids them in maintaining the extension of the patagium when in flight; unlike flying squirrels, their cartilage originates at the elbow joint rather than at the wrist.

Most anomalurid species roost during the day in hollow trees, with up to several dozen animals per tree. They are primarily herbivorous, and may travel up to 6 km (3.7 mi) from their roosting tree in search of leaves, flowers, or fruit, although they also eat a small amount of insects. They give birth to litters up to three young, which are born already furred and active.

Anomalurids represent one of several independent evolutions of gliding ability in mammals, having evolved from climbing animals. The others include the "true" or sciurid flying squirrels of boreal Eurasia and North America, the colugos or "flying lemurs" of Southeast Asia, and marsupial gliding possums of Australia.

== Taxonomy ==
Taxonomy follows Fabre et al. (2018).

- Family Anomaluridae
  - Genus Anomalurus
    - Beecroft's flying squirrel, Anomalurus beecrofti
    - Lord Derby's scaly-tailed flying squirrel, Anomalurus derbianus
    - Pel's flying squirrel, Anomalurus pelii
    - Dwarf scaly-tailed squirrel, Anomalurus pusillus
  - Genus Idiurus
    - Long-eared flying mouse, Idiurus macrotis
    - Pygmy scaly-tailed flying squirrel, Idiurus zenkeri

=== Fossil genera ===
Several fossil genera are also known:

- Genus †Argouburus
- Genus †Eliwourus
- Genus †Kabirmys
- Genus †Paranomalurus
- Genus †Pondaungimys
- Genus †Shazurus

== Specialized morphology ==
=== Patagium ===
The gliding membrane (patagium) of scaly-tailed squirrels consists of three distinct sections: the anterior propatagium extending from the shoulder along the forelimb, the large middle plagiopatagium spanning from forelimb to hindlimb, and the posterior uropatagium connecting the hindlimb to the proximal portion of the tail.

Anomalurids are unique among all other gliding mammals in having a cartilaginous elbow spur, called the unciform element, which projects laterally from the ulna to support the anterior edge of the membrane during flight. This spur differs from the wrist-based styliform cartilage found in flying squirrels, having evolved from the triceps tendon rather than skeletal elements.

The membrane attachment patterns vary between genera, with Anomalurus species having more extensive connections to the hindlimbs compared to the smaller Idiurus species. A specialized brush of stiff hairs on the membrane's dorsal surface just behind the elbow spur serves an aerodynamic function, passively thickening the wing's leading edge to improve airflow during gliding.

=== Tail ===
Unlike the rougher-barked trees found in habitats of other gliding mammals, Anomalurids live on trees with relatively smooth bark like Milicia excelsa that offer fewer natural grip points for claws. This has resulted in them evolving an adaption to aid them in the form a distinctive keratinous scaly organ on the ventral surface of their tail base that gives scaly-tailed squirrels their common name.

This unique structure varies significantly across species in both form and function. In the smaller Idiurus species, the organ consists of dozens of transverse rows of small, smooth, drop-shaped scales occupying one-seventh to one-eighth of the tail length. In contrast, the larger Anomalurus species possess exactly 14 large, triangular scales arranged in two alternating longitudinal rows creating a checkerboard pattern, with each scale equipped with a sharp posterior spike for enhanced grip on tree bark. The scaly organ is supported by enlarged sebaceous glands that provide lubrication to maintain scale flexibility and prevent mechanical damage.

Experimental studies find that these scales function as a specialized anti-skid mechanism which enhances their ability to hold on to surfaces by up to 58% where these have the intermediate roughness of the "smooth-bark" trees found in West African rainforests. The organ acts as a fifth point of contact that improves static stability. This allows the animals to maintain perching positions at inclinations up to 82.5° without active claw engagement—nearly 3° steeper than possible without the scales.

This adaptation seems to be specifically evolved for the drought-tolerant tree species with smoother bark textures that predominate in the upper Guinea rainforest. Scale size and spike development correlate with both body weight and the mechanical demands of gripping these difficult to grasp surfaces.
