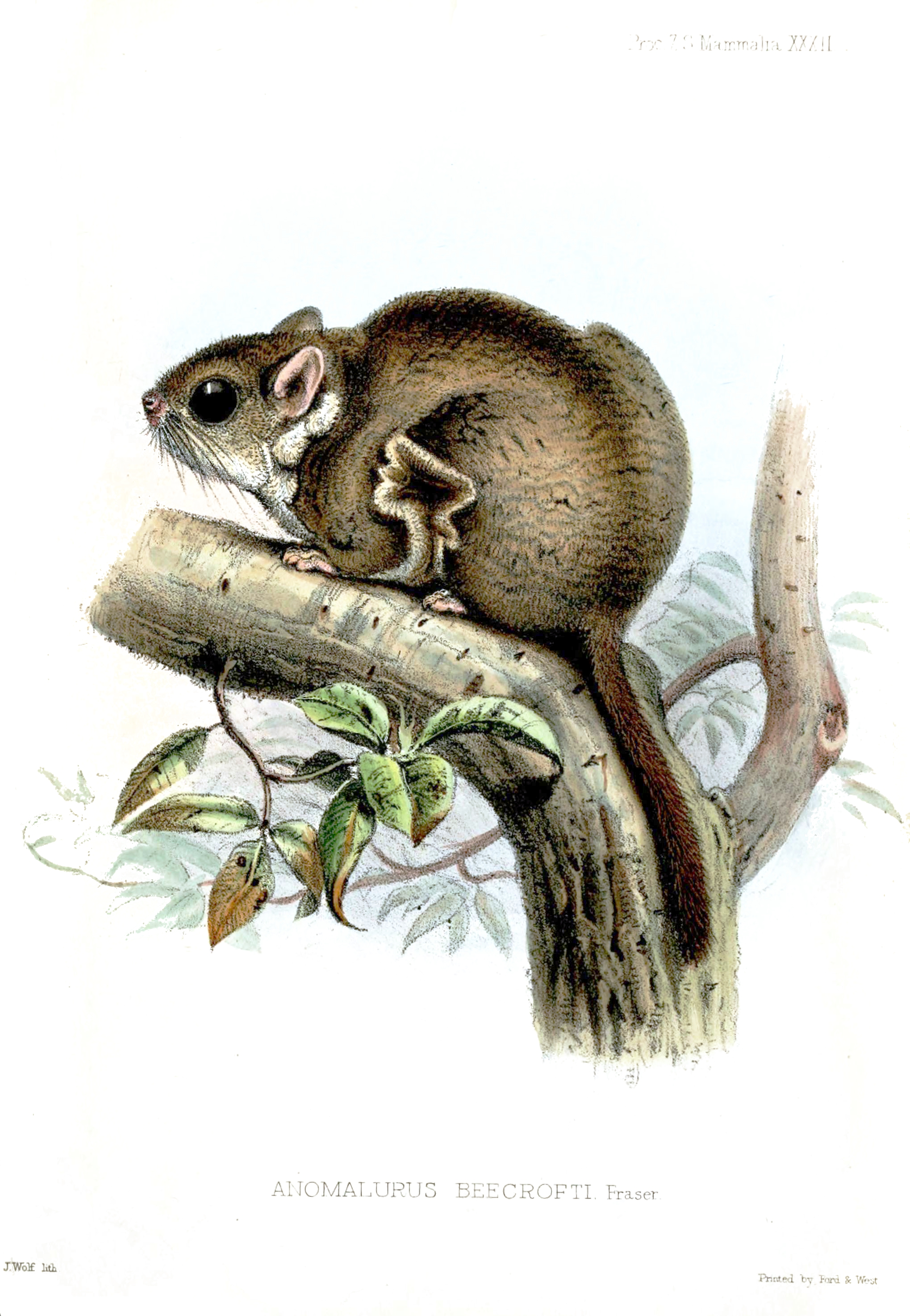
- Anomalurus beecrofti

Scientific classification
- Kingdom: Animalia
- Phylum: Chordata
- Class: Mammalia
- Order: Rodentia
- Family: Anomaluridae
- Subfamily: Anomalurinae; Gervais, 1849
- Genus: Anomalurus; Waterhouse, 1843

Type species
- Anomalurus fraseri Waterhouse, 1843

Species
- Anomalurus beecrofti Anomalurus derbianus Anomalurus pelii Anomalurus pusillus
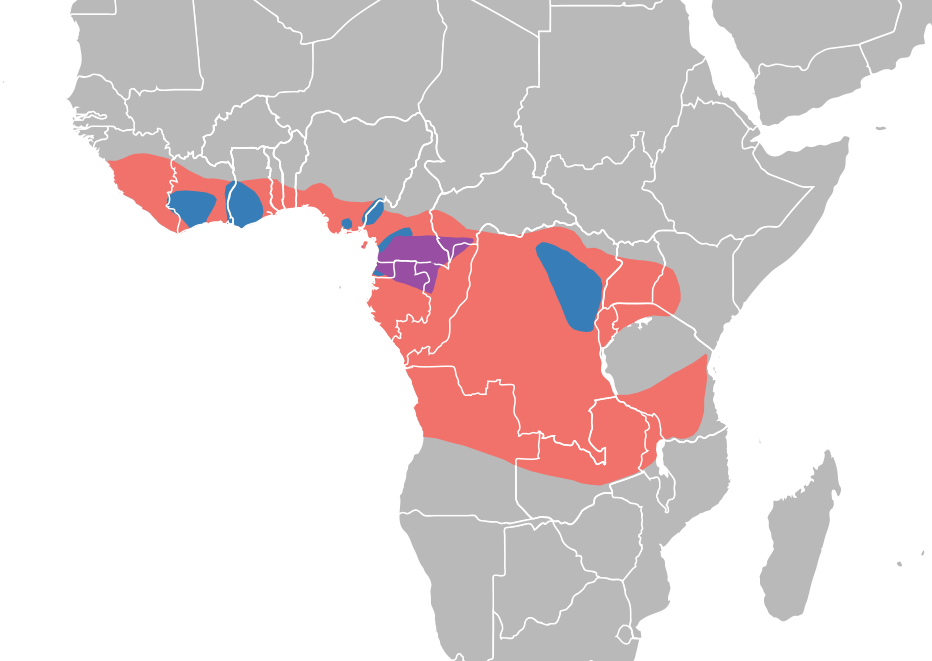
- Anomaluridae distribution. Anomalurus in red, Idiurus in blue, Zenkerella in purple.

Synonyms
- Anomalurops Matschie, 1914

= Anomalurus =

Anomalurus Temporal range: Middle Miocene to Recent

Genus of rodents

Anomalurus is the largest genus in the rodent family Anomaluridae, with four species. It is the only genus in the subfamily Anomalurinae.

== Species ==
- A. beecrofti - Beecroft's scaly-tailed squirrel
- A. derbianus - Lord Derby's scaly-tailed squirrel
- A. pelii - Pel's scaly-tailed squirrel
- A. pusillus - dwarf scaly-tailed squirrel

Beecroft's scaly-tailed squirrel, Anomalurus beecrofti, is sometimes moved to its own genus, Anomalurops, but Dieterlen (2005) and other authorities consider it to be part of Anomalurus.
