= List of eulipotyphlans =

Animals in mammal order Eulipotyphla

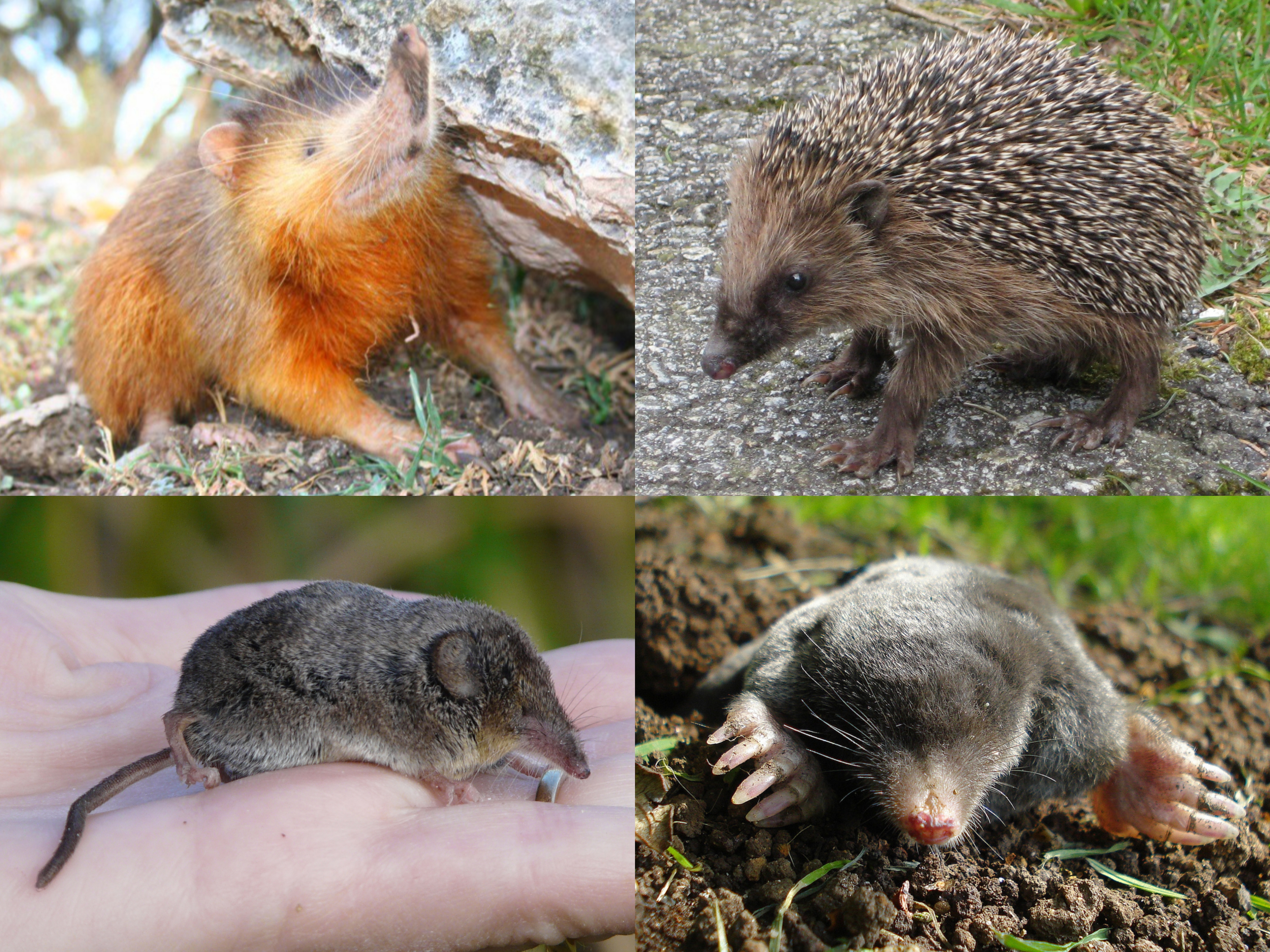
Clockwise from upper left: Hispaniolan solenodon (Solenodon paradoxus), European hedgehog (Erinaceus europaeus), European mole (Talpa europaea), and ornate shrew (Sorex ornatus)

Eulipotyphla is an order of placental mammals which includes hedgehogs, gymnures, moles, shrew moles, desmans, solenodons, and shrews. Members of this order are called eulipotyphlans. The order currently comprises 497 extant species, which are grouped into 53 genera. Eulipotyphlans live worldwide, with the exceptions of Australia and most of South America, and in a variety of habitats, particularly forests, shrublands, and grasslands, but also including savannas, wetlands, deserts, and rocky areas. They come in a variety of body plans in contrasting shapes and sizes, and range in size from the Etruscan shrew, at 3 cm (1 in) plus a 3 cm (1 in) tail to the moonrat, at 46 cm (18 in) plus a 30 cm (12 in) tail.

Eulipotyphla is divided into four families: Erinaceidae, containing the hedgehogs and gymnures; Solenodontidae, containing the solenodons; Soricidae, containing the shrews; and Talpidae, containing the moles, shrew moles, and desmans. Erinaceidae has twenty-four species split between the subfamilies Erinaceinae (hedgehogs) and Galericinae (gymnures). Solenodontidae has only two species. Soricidae has 429 species split between the subfamilies Crocidurinae (white-toothed shrews), Myosoricinae (African shrews), and Soricinae (red-toothed shrews). Talpidae has 45 species split between the subfamilies Scalopinae (moles), Talpinae (moles, shrew moles, and desmans), and Uropsilinae (shrew moles). The exact classification of the species is not fixed, with many recent proposals made based on molecular phylogenetic analysis. One species was declared extinct in 2025, the Christmas Island shrew, the only one to have gone extinct since 1500 CE, and over 50 species, or more than 10 percent of all eulipotyphlans, are considered endangered or critically endangered.

== Conventions ==
The author citation for the species or genus is given after the scientific name; parentheses around the author citation indicate that this was not the original taxonomic placement. Range maps are provided wherever possible; if a range map is not available, a description of the collective range of species in that genera is provided. Ranges are based on the International Union for Conservation of Nature (IUCN) Red List of Threatened Species unless otherwise noted. All extinct genera or species listed alongside extant species went extinct after 1500 CE, and are indicated by a dagger symbol "†".

== Classification ==
The order Eulipotyphla consists of 497 extant species belonging to 53 genera. This does not include hybrid species, extinct prehistoric species, or the Christmas Island shrew, which was declared extinct in 2025. Modern molecular studies indicate that the 53 genera can be grouped into 4 families, and some of these families are subdivided into named subfamilies.

Family Erinaceidae

- Subfamily Erinaceinae (hedgehogs): 5 genera, 16 species
- Subfamily Galericinae (gymnures): 5 genera, 8 species

Family Solenodontidae (solenodons): 2 genera, 2 species

Family Soricidae

- Subfamily Crocidurinae (white-toothed shrews): 9 genera, 245 species (1 extinct)
- Subfamily Myosoricinae (African shrews): 3 genera, 25 species
- Subfamily Soricinae (red-toothed shrews): 13 genera, 159 species

Family Talpidae

- Subfamily Scalopinae (moles): 5 genera, 7 species
- Subfamily Talpinae (moles, shrew moles, and desmans): 11 genera, 33 species
- Subfamily Uropsilinae (shrew moles): 1 genus, 4 species

- Eulipotyphla
  - - Talpidae
      - Uropsilinae
      - - Scalopinae
        - Talpinae
  - - Solenodontidae
    - - Erinaceidae
        - Erinaceinae
        - Galericinae
      - Soricidae
        - - Crocidurinae
          - Myosoricinae
        - Soricinae

== Eulipotyphlans ==
The following classification is based on the taxonomy described by Mammal Species of the World (2005), with augmentation by generally accepted proposals made since using molecular phylogenetic analysis, as supported by both the IUCN and the American Society of Mammalogists.

=== Family Erinaceidae ===
Members of the Erinaceidae family are erinaceids, and include hedgehogs and gymnures. Erinaceidae comprises twenty-four extant species divided into 10 genera. These genera are grouped into two subfamilies: Erinaceinae, or hedgehogs, and Galericinae, or gymnures.

Subfamily Erinaceinae – G. Fischer, 1814 – five genera
Name	Authority and species	Range	Size and ecology
Atelerix (African hedgehog)	Pomel, 1848 Four species: A. albiventris (Four-toed hedgehog, pictured); A. algirus (North African hedgehog); A. frontalis (Southern African hedgehog); A. sclateri (Somali hedgehog)	Africa	Size range: 15 cm (6 in) long, plus 2 cm (1 in) tail (Southern African hedgehog) to 27 cm (11 in) long, plus 2 cm (1 in) tail (Somali hedgehog) Habitats: Shrubland, grassland, forest, and savanna Diets: Omnivorous
Erinaceus (woodland hedgehog)	Linnaeus, 1758 Four species: E. amurensis (Amur hedgehog); E. concolor (Southern white-breasted hedgehog); E. europaeus (European hedgehog); E. roumanicus (Northern white-breasted hedgehog, pictured)	Europe, western Asia, eastern Asia, and New Zealand	Size range: 13 cm (5 in) long, plus 2 cm (1 in) tail (European hedgehog) to 30 cm (12 in) long, plus 5 cm (2 in) tail (Northern white-breasted hedgehog) Habitats: Shrubland, grassland, and forest Diets: Insects and other invertebrates, eggs, small vertebrates, carrion, and fruit
Hemiechinus (long-eared hedgehog)	Fitzinger, 1866 Two species: H. auritus (Long-eared hedgehog, pictured); H. collaris (Indian long-eared hedgehog)	Western, central, and southern Asia	Size range: 12 cm (5 in) long, plus 1 cm (0.4 in) tail (Long-eared hedgehog) to 28 cm (11 in) long, plus 6 cm (2 in) tail (Indian long-eared hedgehog) Habitats: Shrubland, grassland, and desert Diets: Omnivorous; primarily invertebrates and insects, as well as small vertebrates, eggs, carrion, fruit, vegetables, and seeds
Mesechinus (steppe hedgehog)	Ognew, 1951 Two species: M. dauuricus (Daurian hedgehog); M. hughi (Hugh's hedgehog, pictured)	Eastern Asia	Size range: About 24 cm (9 in) long, plus 3 cm (1 in) tail Habitats: Grassland and forest Diets: Omnivorous; primarily invertebrates and insects, as well as small vertebrates, eggs, carrion, fruit, and seeds
Paraechinus (desert hedgehog)	Trouessart, 1879 Four species: P. aethiopicus (Desert hedgehog, pictured); P. hypomelas (Brandt's hedgehog); P. micropus (Indian hedgehog); P. nudiventris (Bare-bellied hedgehog)	Southern and western Asia, Northern Africa, and Arabian Peninsula	Size range: 14–28 cm (6–11 in) long, plus 1–4 cm (0.4–1.6 in) tail Habitats: Shrubland, desert, forest, grassland, inland wetlands, and savanna Diets: Insects, as well as other invertebrates, small vertebrates, and eggs

Subfamily Galericinae – Pomel, 1848 – five genera
Name	Authority and species	Range	Size and ecology
Echinosorex	Blainville, 1836 One species: E. gymnura (Moonrat)	Southeast Asia	Size: 26–46 cm (10–18 in) long, plus 16–30 cm (6–12 in) tail Habitat: Forest Diet: Invertebrates, as well as frogs, fish, and fruit
Hylomys (gymnure)	Müller, 1839 Three species: H. megalotis (Long-eared gymnure); H. parvus (Dwarf gymnure); H. suillus (Short-tailed gymnure, pictured)	Southeastern Asia	Size range: 9–15 cm (4–6 in) long, plus 1–3 cm (0.4–1.2 in) tail Habitats: Shrubland, rocky areas, and forest Diets: Invertebrates, as well as fruit
Neohylomys	Shaw & Wong, 1959 One species: N. hainanensis (Hainan gymnure)	Hainan island, China	Size: 12–15 cm (5–6 in) long, plus 3–5 cm (1–2 in) tail Habitats: Forest and caves Diet: Insects, worms, and plants
Neotetracus	Trouessart, 1909 One species: N. sinensis (Shrew gymnure)	Southern China	Size: 10–13 cm (4–5 in) long, plus 4–7 cm (2–3 in) tail Habitat: Forest Diet: Insects, worms, and plants
Podogymnura (Philippine gymnure)	Mearns, 1905 Two species: P. aureospinula (Dinagat gymnure); P. truei (Mindanao gymnure)	Philippines	Size range: 13 cm (5 in) long, plus 4 cm (2 in) tail (Mindanao gymnure) to 22 cm (9 in) long, plus 8 cm (3 in) tail (Dinagat gymnure) Habitat: Forest Diets: Insects, worms, birds, and carrion

=== Family Solenodontidae ===
Members of the Solenodontidae family are solenodontids, and it comprises two extant species of solenodons, each in its own genus.

Not assigned to a named subfamily – two genera
Name	Authority and species	Range	Size and ecology
Atopogale	Cabrera, 1925 One species: A. cubana (Cuban solenodon)	Cuba	Size: 28–39 cm (11–15 in) long, plus 17–26 cm (7–10 in) tail Habitat: Forest Diet: Invertebrates, reptiles, fruit, and vegetables, as well as poultry
Solenodon	Brandt, 1833 One species: S. paradoxus (Hispaniolan solenodon)	Hispaniola island in the Dominican Republic and Haiti	Size: 28–39 cm (11–15 in) long, plus 17–26 cm (7–10 in) tail Habitats: Forest and caves Diet: Invertebrates, reptiles, fruit, and vegetables, as well as poultry

=== Family Soricidae ===
Members of the Soricidae family are soricids or shrews. Soricidae comprises 429 extant species divided into 25 genera, as well as one extinct species. These genera are grouped into three subfamilies: Crocidurinae, or white-toothed shrews, Myosoricinae, or African shrews, and Soricinae, or red-toothed shrews.

Subfamily Crocidurinae – Milne-Edwards, 1872 – nine genera
Name	Authority and species	Range	Size and ecology
Crocidura (white-toothed shrew)	Wagler, 1832 203 species (1 extinct): C. aleksandrisi (Cyrenaica shrew); C. allex (East African highland shrew); C. andamanensis (Andaman shrew); C. annamitensis (Annamite shrew); C. ansellorum (Ansell's shrew); C. arabica (Arabian shrew); C. arispa (Jackass shrew); C. armenica (Armenian shrew); C. attenuata (Asian gray shrew); C. attila (Hun shrew); C. australis (Southwest peninsula white-toothed shrew); C. baileyi (Bailey's shrew); C. baletei (Balete's white-toothed shrew); C. baluensis (Kinabalu shrew); C. batakorum (Batak shrew); C. batesi (Bates's shrew); C. beatus (Mindanao shrew); C. beccarii (Beccari's shrew); C. bottegi (Bottego's shrew); C. bottegoides (Bale shrew); C. brevicauda (Short-tailed white-toothed shrew); C. brunnea (Thick-tailed shrew); C. buettikoferi (Buettikofer's shrew); C. caliginea (African dusky shrew); C. canariensis (Canarian shrew); C. caspica (Caspian shrew); C. cinderella (Cinderella shrew); C. congobelgica (Congo white-toothed shrew); C. cranbrooki (Cranbrook's white-toothed shrew); C. crenata (Long-footed shrew); C. crossei (Crosse's shrew); C. cyanea (Reddish-gray musk shrew); C. denti (Dent's shrew); C. desperata (Desperate shrew); C. dhofarensis (Dhofar shrew); C. dolichura (Long-tailed musk shrew); C. douceti (Doucet's musk shrew); C. dsinezumi (Dsinezumi shrew); C. eisentrauti (Eisentraut's shrew); C. elgonius (Elgon shrew); C. elongata (Elongated shrew); C. erica (Heather shrew); C. fingui (Fingui white-toothed shrew); C. fischeri (Fischer's shrew); C. flavescens (Greater red musk shrew); C. floweri (Flower's shrew); C. foetida (Bornean shrew); C. foxi (Fox's shrew); C. fuliginosa (Southeast Asian shrew); C. fulvastra (Savanna shrew); C. fumosa (Smoky white-toothed shrew); C. fuscomurina (Bicolored musk shrew); C. gathornei (Gathorne's shrew); C. glassi (Glass's shrew); C. gmelini (Gmelin's white-toothed shrew); C. goliath (Goliath shrew); C. gracilipes (Peters's musk shrew); C. grandiceps (Large-headed forest shrew); C. grandis (Greater Mindanao shrew); C. grassei (Grasse's shrew); C. grayi (Luzon shrew); C. greenwoodi (Greenwood's shrew); C. gueldenstaedtii (Güldenstädt's shrew); C. guy (Guy's shrew); C. harenna (Harenna shrew); C. hikmiya (Sinharaja white-toothed shrew); C. hildegardeae (Hildegarde's shrew); C. hilliana (Hill's shrew); C. hirta (Lesser red musk shrew); C. hispida (Andaman spiny shrew); C. horsfieldii (Horsfield's shrew); C. hutanis (Hutan shrew); C. indochinensis (Indochinese shrew); C. jacksoni (Jackson's shrew); C. jenkinsi (Jenkins's shrew); C. jouvenetae (Jouvenet's shrew); C. katinka (Katinka's shrew); C. kivuana (Kivu shrew); C. lamottei (Lamotte's shrew); C. lanosa (Kivu long-haired shrew); C. lasiura (Ussuri white-toothed shrew); C. latona (Latona's shrew); C. lea (Sulawesi shrew); C. lepidura (Sumatran giant shrew); C. leucodon (Bicolored shrew); C. levicula (Sulawesi tiny shrew); C. littoralis (Butiaba naked-tailed shrew); C. longipes (Savanna swamp shrew); C. lucina (Lucina's shrew); C. ludia (Ludia's shrew); C. luna (Moonshine shrew); C. lusitania (Mauritanian shrew); C. lwiroensis (Lwiro shrew); C. macarthuri (MacArthur's shrew); C. macmillani (MacMillan's shrew); C. macowi (Nyiro shrew); C. malayana (Malayan shrew); C. manengubae (Manenguba shrew); C. maquassiensis (Makwassie musk shrew); C. mariquensis (Swamp musk shrew); C. maurisca (Gracile naked-tailed shrew); C. maxi (Javanese shrew); C. mdumai (Mduma's shrew); C. mindorus (Mindoro shrew); C. miya (Sri Lankan long-tailed shrew); C. monax (Kilimanjaro shrew); C. monticola (Sunda shrew); C. montis (Montane white-toothed shrew); C. munissii (Munissi's shrew); C. muricauda (West African long-tailed shrew); C. musseri (Mossy forest shrew); C. mutesae (Ugandan musk shrew); C. nana (Somali dwarf shrew); C. nanilla (Savanna dwarf shrew); C. negligens (Peninsular shrew); C. negrina (Negros shrew); C. nicobarica (Nicobar shrew); C. nigeriae (Nigerian shrew); C. nigricans (Blackish white-toothed shrew); C. nigripes (Black-footed shrew); C. nigrofusca (African black shrew); C. nimbae (Nimba shrew); C. nimbasilvanus (Mount Nimba giant forest shrew); C. ninoyi (Sibuyan shrew); C. niobe (Niobe's shrew); C. normalis (Typical Sulawesi white-toothed shrew); C. obscurior (West African pygmy shrew); C. olivieri (African giant shrew); C. ordinaria (West Sulawesi white-toothed shrew); C. orientalis (Oriental shrew); C. orii (Ryukyu shrew); C. pachyura (North African white-toothed shrew); C. palawanensis (Palawan shrew); C. pallida (Pallid-footed white-toothed shrew); C. panayensis (Panay shrew); C. paradoxura (Sumatran long-tailed shrew); C. parva (Tiny Sulawesi white-toothed shrew); C. parvipes (Small-footed shrew); C. pasha (Sahelian tiny shrew); C. pergrisea (Pale gray shrew); C. phaeura (Guramba shrew); C. phanluongi (Phan Luong's shrew); C. phuquocensis (Phu Hoc shrew); C. picea (Cameroonian shrew); C. pitmani (Pitman's shrew); C. planiceps (Flat-headed shrew); C. poensis (Fraser's musk shrew); C. polia (Polia's shrew); C. pseudorhoditis (North peninsula white-toothed shrew); C. pullata (Kashmir white-toothed shrew); C. quasielongata (Southern elongated white-toothed shrew); C. raineyi (Rainey's shrew); C. ramona (Negev shrew); C. rapax (Chinese white-toothed shrew); C. religiosa (Egyptian pygmy shrew); C. rhoditis (Sulawesi white-handed shrew); C. roosevelti (Roosevelt's shrew); C. russula (Greater white-toothed shrew); C. sapaensis (Sa Pa shrew); C. selina (Ugandan lowland shrew); C. serezkyensis (Lesser rock shrew); C. shantungensis (Asian lesser white-toothed shrew); C. sibirica (Siberian shrew); C. sicula (Sicilian shrew); C. silacea (Lesser gray-brown musk shrew); C. smithii (Desert musk shrew); C. sokolovi (Sokolov's shrew); C. solita (West-central Sulawesi white-toothed shrew); C. somalica (Somali shrew); C. stenocephala (Narrow-headed shrew); C. suaveolens (Lesser white-toothed shrew); C. susiana (Iranian shrew); C. tanakae (Taiwanese gray shrew); C. tansaniana (Tanzanian shrew); C. tarella (Tarella shrew); C. tarfayensis (Saharan shrew); C. telfordi (Telford's shrew); C. tenebrosa (Dark white-toothed shrew); C. tenuis (Timor shrew); C. thalia (Thalia's shrew); C. theresae (Therese's shrew); C. thomensis (São Tomé shrew); C. trichura (Christmas Island shrew †); C. turba (Turbo shrew); C. ultima (Ultimate shrew); C. umbra (Javan ghost shrew); C. usambarae (Usambara shrew); C. viaria (Savanna path shrew); C. virgata (Mamfe shrew); C. voi (Voi shrew); C. vorax (Voracious shrew); C. vosmaeri (Banka shrew); C. watasei (Lesser Ryukyu shrew); C. whitakeri (Whitaker's shrew); C. wimmeri (Wimmer's shrew); C. wuchihensis (Hainan Island shrew); C. xantippe (Xanthippe's shrew); C. yaldeni (Beletta shrew); C. yankariensis (Yankari shrew); C. zaphiri (Zaphir's shrew); C. zarudnyi (Zarudny's rock shrew); C. zimmeri (Upemba shrew); C. zimmermanni (Cretan shrew)	Europe, Africa, and non-Arctic Asia	Size range: 4–18 cm (2–7 in) long, plus 4–11 cm (2–4 in) tail Habitats: Shrubland, desert, coastal/supratidal marine, rocky areas, forest, intertidal marine, grassland, inland wetlands, savanna, and caves Diets: Insects and other invertebrates, as well as small mammals, frogs, toads, and lizards
Diplomesodon	Brandt, 1852 One species: D. pulchellum (Piebald shrew)	Central Asia	Size: 5–8 cm (2–3 in) long, plus 2–4 cm (1–2 in) tail Habitat: Desert Diet: Insects, as well as small lizards
Feroculus	Kelaart, 1852 One species: F. feroculus (Kelaart's long-clawed shrew)	Southern India and Sri Lanka	Size: 10–12 cm (4–5 in) long, plus 5–8 cm (2–3 in) tail Habitats: Forest, grassland, and inland wetlands Diet: Earthworms, small vertebrates, and plants
Paracrocidura (large-headed shrew)	Heim de Balsac, 1956 Three species: P. graueri (Grauer's large-headed shrew); P. maxima (Greater large-headed shrew); P. schoutedeni (Lesser large-headed shrew)	Central Africa	Size range: 6–10 cm (2–4 in) long, plus 3–5 cm (1–2 in) tail Habitats: Forest and inland wetlands Diets: Insects
Ruwenzorisorex	Hutterer, 1986 One species: R. suncoides (Ruwenzori shrew)	Central Africa	Size: 9–10 cm (4 in) Habitats: Inland wetlands and forest Diet: Mollusks and small vertebrates
Scutisorex (hero shrew)	Thomas, 1910 Two species: S. somereni (Hero shrew, pictured); S. thori (Thor's hero shrew)	Central Africa	Size range: 12–15 cm (5–6 in) long, plus 6–10 cm (2–4 in) tail Habitat: Forest Diets: Insects, earthworms, small vertebrates, and plants
Solisorex	Thomas, 1924 One species: S. pearsoni (Pearson's long-clawed shrew)	Sri Lanka	Size: 12–15 cm (5–6 in) long, plus 5–7 cm (2–3 in) tail Habitats: Forest and grassland Diet: Insects, earthworms, and small vertebrates
Suncus (musk shrew or pygmy shrew)	Ehrenberg, 1832 Eighteen species: S. aequatorius (Taita shrew); S. ater (Black shrew); S. dayi (Day's shrew); S. etruscus (Etruscan shrew, pictured); S. fellowesgordoni (Sri Lankan shrew); S. hosei (Bornean pygmy shrew); S. hututsi (Hutu-Tutsi dwarf shrew); S. infinitesimus (Least dwarf shrew); S. lixus (Greater dwarf shrew); S. malayanus (Malayan pygmy shrew); S. megalura (Climbing shrew); S. mertensi (Flores shrew); S. montanus (Asian highland shrew); S. murinus (Asian house shrew); S. remyi (Remy's pygmy shrew); S. stoliczkanus (Anderson's shrew); S. varilla (Lesser dwarf shrew); S. zeylanicus (Jungle shrew)	Europe, Africa, and southern and southeastern Asia	Size range: 3 cm (1 in) long, plus 2 cm (1 in) tail (Etruscan shrew) to 9 cm (4 in) long, plus 10 cm (4 in) tail (Anderson's shrew) Habitats: Shrubland, desert, forest, grassland, inland wetlands, and savanna Diets: Insects and small mammals, as well as plants
Sylvisorex (forest shrew)	Thomas, 1904 Fifteen species: S. akaibei (Dudu Akaibe's pygmy shrew); S. camerunensis (Cameroonian forest shrew); S. corbeti (Corbet's forest shrew); S. granti (Grant's forest shrew); S. howelli (Howell's forest shrew); S. isabellae (Bioko forest shrew); S. johnstoni (Johnston's forest shrew); S. konganensis (Kongana shrew); S. lunaris (Moon forest shrew); S. morio (Mount Cameroon forest shrew); S. ollula (Greater forest shrew); S. oriundus (Lesser forest shrew, pictured); S. pluvialis (Rain forest shrew); S. silvanorum (Bamenda pygmy shrew); S. vulcanorum (Volcano shrew)	Central Africa	Size range: 4–10 cm (2–4 in) long, plus 4–9 cm (2–4 in) tail Habitats: Grassland, forest, and inland wetlands Diets: Insects

Subfamily Myosoricinae – Kretzoi, 1965 – three genera
Name	Authority and species	Range	Size and ecology
Congosorex (Congo shrew)	Heim de Balsac & Lamotte, 1956 Three species: C. phillipsorum (Phillips' Congo shrew); C. polli (Greater Congo shrew); C. verheyeni (Lesser Congo shrew)	Central Africa	Size range: 5–10 cm (2–4 in) long, plus 1–3 cm (0.4–1.2 in) tail (Lesser Congo shrew) Habitat: Forest Diets: Invertebrates
Myosorex (mouse shrew)	Gray, 1838 Nineteen species: M. babaulti (Babault's mouse shrew); M. blarina (Montane mouse shrew); M. bururiensis (Bururi forest shrew); M. cafer (Dark-footed mouse shrew); M. eisentrauti (Eisentraut's mouse shrew); M. geata (Geata mouse shrew); M. gnoskei (Nyika burrowing shrew); M. jejei (Kahuzi swamp shrew); M. kabogoensis (Kabogo mouse shrew); M. kihaulei (Kihaule's mouse shrew); M. longicaudatus (Long-tailed forest shrew); M. meesteri (Meester's forest shrew); M. okuensis (Oku mouse shrew); M. rumpii (Rumpi mouse shrew); M. schalleri (Schaller's mouse shrew); M. sclateri (Sclater's mouse shrew); M. tenuis (Thin mouse shrew); M. varius (Forest shrew, pictured); M. zinki (Kilimanjaro mouse shrew)	Central and southern Africa	Size range: 6–11 cm (2–4 in) long, plus 2–7 cm (1–3 in) tail Habitats: Shrubland, forest, grassland, inland wetlands, and savanna Diets: A variety of invertebrates, as well as seeds, small birds, and mammals
Surdisorex (African mole shrew)	Thomas, 1906 Three species: S. norae (Aberdare mole shrew); S. polulus (Mount Kenya mole shrew); S. schlitteri (Mount Elgon mole shrew, pictured)	Kenya	Size range: 6–11 cm (2–4 in) long, plus 2–7 cm (1–3 in) tail Habitats: Shrubland and grassland Diets: Earthworms, as well as insects, small birds, and mammals

Subfamily Soricinae – G. Fischer, 1817 – thirteen genera
Name	Authority and species	Range	Size and ecology
Anourosorex (Asian mole shrew)	A. Milne-Edwards, 1872 Four species: A. assamensis (Assam mole shrew); A. schmidi (Giant mole shrew); A. squamipes (Chinese mole shrew); A. yamashinai (Taiwanese mole shrew, pictured)	Taiwan, and southern and eastern Asia	Size range: 8–12 cm (3–5 in) long, plus 0.5–2 cm (0.2–0.8 in) tail Habitats: Grassland, rocky areas, and forest Diets: Insects and worms, as well as plants
Blarina (short-tailed shrew)	Gray, 1838 Four species: B. brevicauda (Northern short-tailed shrew); B. carolinensis (Southern short-tailed shrew, pictured); B. hylophaga (Elliot's short-tailed shrew); B. peninsulae (Everglades short-tailed shrew)	Central United States, Southeastern United States, Eastern North America, and Florida	Size range: 7–11 cm (3–4 in) long, plus 1–3 cm (0.4–1.2 in) tail Habitats: Shrubland, forest, grassland, and inland wetlands Diets: Invertebrates, as well as small vertebrates and plants
Blarinella (Asian short-tailed shrew)	Thomas, 1911 Three species: B. griselda (Indochinese short-tailed shrew); B. quadraticauda (Asiatic short-tailed shrew); B. wardi (Burmese short-tailed shrew)	Central and southern China, northern Vietnam, and Myanmar	Size range: 6–9 cm (2–4 in) long, plus 3–6 cm (1–2 in) tail Habitats: Shrubland and forest Diets: Invertebrates
Chimarrogale (Asiatic water shrew)	Anderson, 1877 Six species: C. hantu (Malayan water shrew); C. himalayica (Himalayan water shrew); C. phaeura (Bornean water shrew); C. platycephalus (Japanese water shrew, pictured); C. styani (Chinese water shrew); C. sumatrana (Sumatran water shrew)	Eastern and southeastern Asia	Size range: 8–14 cm (3–6 in) long, plus 6–13 cm (2–5 in) tail Habitats: Shrubland, forest, and inland wetlands Diets: Invertebrates, crustaceans, and small fish
Chodsigoa (Asiatic shrew)	Kastchenko, 1907 Nine species: C. caovansunga (Van Sung's shrew); C. Hoffmani (Hoffmann's long-tailed shrew); C. hypsibia (De Winton's shrew); C. lamula (Lamulate shrew); C. parca (Lowe's shrew); C. parva (Pygmy brown-toothed shrew); C. salenskii (Salenski's shrew); C. smithii (Smith's shrew); C. sodalis (Lesser Taiwanese shrew)	Central China, Taiwan, and Southern Asia	Size range: 4–10 cm (2–4 in) long, plus 3–12 cm (1–5 in) tail Habitats: Shrubland and forest Diets: Earthworms, insects, and other invertebrates, as well as small mammals
Cryptotis (small-eared shrew)	Pomel, 1848 41 species: C. alticola (Central Mexican broad-clawed shrew); C. aroensis (Sierra de Aroa shrew); C. brachyonyx (Eastern Cordillera small-footed shrew); C. cavatorculus (Santa Barbara broad-clawed shrew); C. celaque (Celaque broad-clawed shrew); C. colombiana (Colombian small-eared shrew); C. dinirensis (Dinira small-eared shrew); C. endersi (Enders's small-eared shrew); C. equatoris (Ecuadorian small-eared shrew); C. goldmani (Goldman's broad-clawed shrew); C. goodwini (Goodwin's broad-clawed shrew); C. gracilis (Talamancan small-eared shrew); C. griseoventris (Guatemalan broad-clawed shrew); C. hondurensis (Honduran small-eared shrew); C. lacertosus (Muscular broad-clawed shrew); C. magna (Big Mexican small-eared shrew); C. mam (Mam broad-clawed shrew); C. mayensis (Yucatan small-eared shrew); C. mccarthyi (Omoa broad-clawed shrew); C. medellinia (Medellín small-eared shrew); C. meridensis (Merida small-eared shrew); C. merriami (Merriam's small-eared shrew); C. merus (Darién small-eared shrew); C. mexicana (Mexican small-eared shrew); C. montivaga (Wandering small-eared shrew); C. nelsoni (Nelson's small-eared shrew); C. niausa (Blind small-eared shrew); C. nigrescens (Blackish small-eared shrew); C. obscura (Grizzled Mexican small-eared shrew); C. oreoryctes (Yalijux shrew); C. orophila (Central American least shrew); C. parva (North American least shrew, pictured); C. peregrina (Oaxacan broad-clawed shrew); C. perijensis (Perija small-eared shrew); C. peruviensis (Peruvian small-eared shrew); C. phillipsii (Phillips's small-eared shrew); C. squamipes (Scaly-footed small-eared shrew); C. tamensis (Tamá small-eared shrew); C. thomasi (Thomas's small-eared shrew); C. tropicalis (Tropical small-eared shrew); C. venezuelensis (Venezuelan small-eared shrew)	North America, Central America, and northern South America	Size range: 5 cm (2 in) long, plus 1 cm (0.4 in) tail (big Mexican small-eared shrew) to 11 cm (4 in) long, plus 5 cm (2 in) tail (Merida small-eared shrew) Habitats: Shrubland, forest, rocky areas, grassland, and inland wetlands Diets: Insects, as well as other invertebrates, small lizards and frogs, eggs, plants, and carrion
Episoriculus (brown-toothed shrew)	Ellerman & Morrison-Scott, 1966 Four species: E. caudatus (Hodgson's brown-toothed shrew); E. fumidus (Taiwanese brown-toothed shrew); E. leucops (Long-tailed brown-toothed shrew); E. macrurus (Long-tailed mountain shrew)	Taiwan and Southern Asia	Size range: 4–7 cm (2–3 in) long, plus 3–7 cm (1–3 in) tail Habitats: Shrubland, grassland, and forest Diets: Earthworms, insects, and other invertebrates, as well as small mammals
Megasorex	Hibbard, 1950 One species: M. gigas (Mexican shrew)	Southern Mexico	Size: 8–9 cm (3–4 in) long, plus 3–5 cm (1–2 in) tail Habitats: Forest and shrubland Diet: Invertebrates
Nectogale	A. Milne-Edwards, 1870 One species: N. elegans (Elegant water shrew)	Central China and southern Asia	Size: 9–13 cm (4–5 in) long, plus 8–11 cm (3–4 in) tail Habitats: Forest and inland wetlands Diet: Insects, crustaceans, and small fish
Neomys (water shrew)	Kaup, 1829 Four species: N. anomalus (Iberian water shrew); N. fodiens (Eurasian water shrew); N. milleri (Mediterranean water shrew, pictured); N. teres (Transcaucasian water shrew)	Europe and Asia	Size range: 6–10 cm (2–4 in) long, plus 4–8 cm (2–3 in) tail Habitats: Forest, grassland, inland wetlands, intertidal marine, and coastal marine Diets: Invertebrates, molluscs, fish, amphibians, frogs, and small rodents
Notiosorex (gray shrew)	Coues, 1877 Four species: N. cockrumi (Cockrum's gray shrew); N. crawfordi (Crawford's gray shrew, pictured); N. evotis (Large-eared gray shrew); N. villai (Villa's gray shrew)	Southern North America	Size range: 4–7 cm (2–3 in) long, plus 2–4 cm (1–2 in) tail Habitats: Shrubland, grassland, forest, and desert Diets: Worms, spiders, and insects, as well as small mammals, lizards, birds, and carrion
Sorex (long-tailed shrew)	Linnaeus, 1758 76 species: S. alaskanus (Glacier Bay water shrew); S. alpinus (Alpine shrew); S. antinorii (Valais shrew); S. araneus (Common shrew); S. arcticus (Arctic shrew); S. arizonae (Arizona shrew); S. asper (Tien Shan shrew); S. bairdi (Baird's shrew); S. bedfordiae (Lesser striped shrew); S. bendirii (Marsh shrew); S. buchariensis (Buchara shrew); S. caecutiens (Laxmann's shrew); S. camtschatica (Kamchatka shrew); S. cansulus (Gansu shrew); S. cinereus (Cinereus shrew); S. coronatus (Crowned shrew); S. cylindricauda (Greater stripe-backed shrew); S. daphaenodon (Siberian large-toothed shrew); S. dispar (Long-tailed shrew); S. emarginatus (Zacatecas shrew); S. excelsus (Chinese highland shrew); S. fumeus (Smoky shrew); S. gracillimus (Slender shrew); S. granarius (Iberian shrew); S. haydeni (Prairie shrew); S. hosonoi (Azumi shrew); S. hoyi (American pygmy shrew); S. isodon (Taiga shrew); S. ixtlanensis (Ixtlan shrew); S. jacksoni (Saint Lawrence Island shrew); S. kozlovi (Kozlov's shrew); S. leucogaster (Paramushir shrew); S. longirostris (Southeastern shrew); S. lyelli (Mount Lyell shrew); S. macrodon (Large-toothed shrew); S. maritimensis (Maritime shrew); S. mediopua (Jalisco shrew); S. merriami (Merriam's shrew); S. milleri (Carmen Mountain shrew); S. minutissimus (Eurasian least shrew); S. minutus (Eurasian pygmy shrew, pictured); S. mirabilis (Ussuri shrew); S. monticolus (Montane shrew); S. nanus (Dwarf shrew); S. neomexicanus (New Mexico shrew); S. oreopolus (Mexican long-tailed shrew); S. orizabae (Orizaba long-tailed shrew); S. ornatus (Ornate shrew); S. pacificus (Pacific shrew); S. palustris (American water shrew); S. planiceps (Kashmir pygmy shrew); S. portenkoi (Portenko's shrew); S. preblei (Preble's shrew); S. pribilofensis (Pribilof Island shrew); S. raddei (Radde's shrew); S. roboratus (Flat-skulled shrew); S. samniticus (Apennine shrew); S. satunini (Caucasian shrew); S. saussurei (Saussure's shrew); S. sclateri (Sclater's shrew); S. shinto (Shinto shrew); S. sinalis (Chinese shrew); S. sonomae (Fog shrew); S. stizodon (San Cristobal shrew); S. tenellus (Inyo shrew); S. thibetanus (Tibetan shrew); S. trowbridgii (Trowbridge's shrew); S. tundrensis (Tundra shrew); S. ugyunak (Barren ground shrew); S. unguiculatus (Long-clawed shrew); S. vagrans (Vagrant shrew); S. ventralis (Chestnut-bellied shrew); S. veraecrucis (Veracruz shrew); S. veraepacis (Verapaz shrew); S. volnuchini (Caucasian pygmy shrew); S. yukonicus (Alaska tiny shrew)	Europe, Asia, North America, and Central America	Size range: 3 cm (1 in) long, plus 3 cm (1 in) tail (Eurasian pygmy shrew) to 12 cm (5 in) long, plus 4 cm (2 in) tail (Tundra shrew) Habitats: Shrubland, desert, forest, rocky areas, grassland, inland wetlands, coastal marine, and unknown Diets: Insects and other invertebrates, as well as small vertebrates, seeds, lichen, fungi, and plants
Soriculus	Blyth, 1854 One species: S. nigrescens (Himalayan shrew)	Himalayas in Asia	Size: 8–10 cm (3–4 in) long, plus 3–7 cm (1–3 in) tail Habitats: Forest, shrubland, and rocky areas Diet: Earthworms, insects, and other invertebrates, as well as small mammals

=== Family Talpidae ===
Members of the Talpidae family are talpids, and include moles, shrew moles, and desmans. Talpidae comprises 24 extant species divided into 17 genera. These genera are grouped into three subfamilies: Scalopinae, or moles, Talpinae, containing moles, shrew moles, and desmans, and Uropsilinae, or shrew moles.

Subfamily Scalopinae – Gill, 1875 – five genera
Name	Authority and species	Range	Size and ecology
Condylura	Illiger, 1811 One species: C. cristata (Star-nosed mole)	Eastern United States and Canada	Size: 10–13 cm (4–5 in) long, plus 5–9 cm (2–4 in) tail Habitats: Forest, shrubland, and inland wetlands Diet: Aquatic invertebrates, as well as other invertebrates, crustaceans, mollusks and small fish
Parascalops	True, 1894 One species: P. breweri (Hairy-tailed mole)	Eastern United States and Canada	Size: 13–18 cm (5–7 in) long, plus 3 cm (1 in) tail Habitats: Forest, shrubland, and grassland Diet: Insects, as well as other invertebrates
Scalopus	Geoffroy, 1803 One species: S. aquaticus (Eastern mole)	Eastern and central North America	Size: 14–19 cm (6–7 in) long, plus 1–4 cm (0.4–1.6 in) tail Habitats: Forest and grassland Diet: Insects and earthworms, as well as plants
Scapanulus	Thomas, 1912 One species: S. oweni (Gansu mole)	Central China	Size: 9–11 cm (4 in), plus 3–4 cm (1–2 in) tail Habitat: Forest Diet: Earthworms and other invertebrates
Scapanus (western mole)	Pomel, 1848 Three species: S. latimanus (Northern broad-footed mole, pictured); S. orarius (Coast mole); S. townsendii (Townsend's mole)	Western North America	Size range: 11 cm (4 in) long, plus 2 cm (1 in) tail (northern broad-footed mole) to 19 cm (7 in) long, plus 5 cm (2 in) tail (coast mole) Habitats: Coastal marine, grassland, forest, and savanna Diets: Earthworms, as well as other invertebrates, plants, and fungi

Subfamily Talpinae – G. Fischer, 1814 – eleven genera
Name	Authority and species	Range	Size and ecology
Desmana	Güldenstädt, 1777 One species: D. moschata (Russian desman)	Western and central Asia	Size: 18–22 cm (7–9 in) long, plus 17–22 cm (7–9 in) tail Habitat: Inland wetlands Diet: Fish, mollusks, amphibians, crustaceans, and insects
Dymecodon	True, 1886 One species: D. pilirostris (True's shrew mole)	Japan	Size: 6–11 cm (2–4 in) long, plus 2–5 cm (1–2 in) tail Habitats: Forest, shrubland, and grassland Diet: Worms, insects, and other invertebrates
Euroscaptor (Asiatic mole)	Miller, 1940 Seven species: E. grandis (Greater Chinese mole); E. klossi (Kloss's mole, pictured); E. longirostris (Long-nosed mole); E. micrura (Himalayan mole); E. mizura (Japanese mountain mole); E. parvidens (Small-toothed mole); E. subanura (Vietnamese mole)	Eastern and southeastern Asia	Size range: 7 cm (3 in) long, plus 4 cm (2 in) tail (Vietnamese mole) to 15 cm (6 in) long, plus 10 cm (4 in) tail (greater Chinese mole) Habitats: Grassland and forest Diets: Insects and other invertebrates
Galemys	Kaup, 1829 One species: G. pyrenaicus (Pyrenean desman)	Iberian Peninsula	Size: 11–16 cm (4–6 in) long, plus 12–16 cm (5–6 in) tail Habitat: Inland wetlands Diet: Insects and crustaceans
Mogera (East Asian mole)	Pomel, 1848 Seven species: M. etigo (Echigo mole); M. imaizumii (Small Japanese mole, pictured); M. insularis (Insular mole); M. robusta (Ussuri mole); M. tokudae (Sado mole); M. uchidai (Senkaku mole); M. wogura (Japanese mole)	Eastern Asia	Size range: 8 cm (3 in) long, plus 1 cm (0.4 in) tail (Insular mole) to 20 cm (8 in) long, plus 2 cm (1 in) tail (Ussuri mole) Habitats: Shrubland, grassland, and forest Diets: Earthworms, caterpillars and insects
Neurotrichus	Günther, 1880 One species: N. gibbsii (American shrew mole)	Western North America	Size: 6–9 cm (2–4 in) long, plus 3–5 cm (1–2 in) tail Habitats: Forest, shrubland, grassland, and inland wetlands Diet: Earthworms, insects, other invertebrates, fungi, and seeds
Parascaptor	Gill, 1875 One species: P. leucura (White-tailed mole)	Eastern Asia	Size: 11–12 cm (4–5 in) long, plus 1–2 cm (0.4–0.8 in) tail Habitat: Forest Diet: Likely earthworms and other invertebrates
Scaptochirus	H. Milne-Edwards, 1867 One species: S. moschatus (Short-faced mole)	Northern China	Size: About 14 cm (6 in) Habitats: Desert and grassland Diet: Arthropod larvae
Scaptonyx	H. Milne-Edwards, 1872 One species: S. fusicaudus (Long-tailed mole)	Eastern Asia	Size: 6–9 cm (2–4 in) long, plus 4–6 cm (2 in) tail Habitat: Forest Diet: Likely earthworms and other invertebrates
Talpa (European mole)	Linnaeus, 1758 Eleven species: T. altaica (Altai mole); T. caeca (Blind mole); T. caucasica (Caucasian mole); T. davidiana (Père David's mole); T. europaea (European mole); T. levantis (Levant mole); T. occidentalis (Spanish mole, pictured); T. ognevi (Ognev's mole); T. romana (Roman mole); T. stankovici (Balkan mole); T. talyschensis (Talysch mole)	Europe and western and northern Asia	Size range: 9–18 cm (4–7 in) long, plus 1–4 cm (0.4–1.6 in) tail Habitats: Coastal marine, grassland, forest, and shrubland Diets: Earthworms and insects
Urotrichus	Temminck, 1841 One species: U. talpoides (Japanese shrew mole)	Japan	Size: 6–11 cm (2–4 in) long, plus 2–5 cm (1–2 in) tail Habitats: Forest, shrubland, and grassland Diet: Insects, spiders, worms, and other invertebrates

Subfamily Uropsilinae – Dobson, 1883 – one genus
Name	Authority and species	Range	Size and ecology
Uropsilus (shrew-like mole)	A. Milne-Edwards, 1871 Four species: U. andersoni (Anderson's shrew mole); U. gracilis (Gracile shrew mole); U. investigator (Inquisitive shrew mole); U. soricipes (Chinese shrew mole)	Central and southern China and northern Myanmar	Size range: 6–9 cm (2–4 in) long, plus 5–8 cm (2–3 in) tail Habitats: Shrubland, grassland, and forest Diets: Invertebrates

== Sources ==
- Kingdon, Jonathan (2014). Mammals of Africa. Vol. IV: Hedgehogs, Shrews and Bats. A & C Black. ISBN 978-1-4081-8993-1.
- Nowak, Ronald M. (1999). Walker's Mammals of the World. Vol. 1. Johns Hopkins University Press. ISBN 978-0-8018-5789-8.
- Smith, Andrew T.; Xie, Yan, eds. (2010). A Guide to the Mammals of China. Princeton University Press. ISBN 978-1-4008-3411-2.
- Hutterer, Rainer (2005). Wilson, Don E.; Reeder, DeeAnn M. (eds.). Mammal Species of the World. Vol. 1 (3rd ed.). Johns Hopkins University Press. ISBN 978-0-8018-8221-0.
