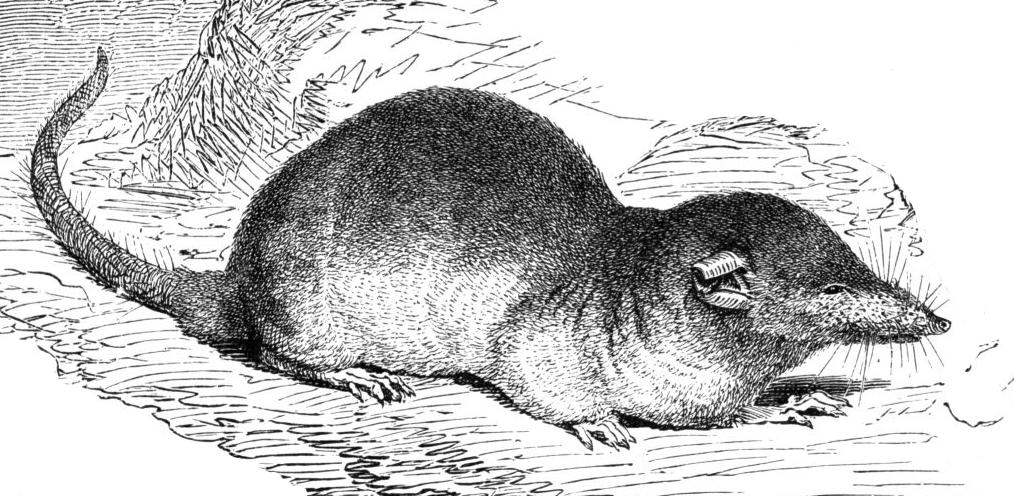
- Greater white-toothed shrew (Crocidura russula)

Scientific classification
- Kingdom: Animalia
- Phylum: Chordata
- Class: Mammalia
- Order: Eulipotyphla
- Family: Soricidae
- Subfamily: Crocidurinae

Type genus
- Crocidura Wagler, 1832

Genera
- see species list

= White-toothed shrew =

Crocidurinae Temporal range: Miocene to Recent

Subfamily of mammals

The white-toothed shrews or Crocidurinae are one of three subfamilies of the shrew family Soricidae.

The outer layer of these shrews' teeth is white, unlike that of the red-toothed shrews which possess iron-reinforced enamel. These species are typically found in Africa and southern Europe and Asia. This subfamily includes the largest shrew, the Asian house shrew, Suncus murinus, at about 15 cm in length, and the smallest, the Etruscan shrew, Suncus etruscus, at about 3.5 cm in length and 2 grams in weight. The latter is possibly the world's smallest extant mammal, although some give this title to the bumblebee bat. Crocidura contains the most species of any mammal genus.

When young must be moved before they are independent, mother and young form a chain or "caravan" where each animal hangs on to the rear of the one in front. This behaviour has also been observed in some Sorex species.

== List of species ==
Subfamily Crocidurinae

- Genus Crocidura (white-toothed shrews)
  - Mysterious shrew, Crocidura abscondita
  - Sanetti shrew, Crocidura afeworkbekelei
  - Cyrenaica shrew, Crocidura aleksandrisi
  - East African highland shrew, Crocidura allex
  - Andaman shrew, Crocidura andamanensis
  - Anhui white-toothed shrew, Crocidura anhuiensis
  - Annamite shrew, Crocidura annamitensis
  - Ansell's shrew, Crocidura ansellorum
  - Arabian shrew, Crocidura arabica
  - Jackass shrew, Crocidura arispa
  - Armenian shrew, Crocidura armenica
  - Asian gray shrew, Crocidura attenuata
  - Hun shrew, Crocidura attila
  - Bailey's shrew, Crocidura baileyi
  - Kinabalu shrew, Crocidura baluensis
  - Batak shrew, Crocidura batakorum
  - Bates's shrew, Crocidura batesi
  - Mindanao shrew, Crocidura beatus
  - Beccari's shrew, Crocidura beccarii
  - Bottego's shrew, Crocidura bottegi
  - Bale shrew, Crocidura bottegoides
  - Thick-tailed shrew, Crocidura brunnea
  - Buettikofer's shrew, Crocidura buettikoferi
  - African dusky shrew, Crocidura caliginea
  - Canarian shrew, Crocidura canariensis
  - Caspian shrew, Crocidura caspica
  - Sulawesi hairy-tailed shrew, Crocidura caudipilosa
  - Cinderella shrew, Crocidura cinderella
  - Congo white-toothed shrew, Crocidura congobelgica
  - Cranbrook's shrew, Crocidura cranbooki
  - Long-footed shrew, Crocidura crenata
  - Crosse's shrew, Crocidura crossei
  - Reddish-gray musk shrew, Crocidura cyanea
  - Dent's shrew, Crocidura denti
  - Desperate shrew, Crocidura desperata
  - Dhofar shrew, Crocidura dhofarensis
  - Long-tailed musk shrew, Crocidura dolichura
  - Dongjiangyuan white-toothed shrew, Crocidura dongyangjiangensis
  - Doucet's musk shrew, Crocidura douceti
  - Dracula shrew, Crocidura dracula
  - Dsinezumi shrew, Crocidura dsinezumi
  - Ivory Coast white-toothed shrew, Crocidura eburnea
  - Eisentraut's shrew, Crocidura eisentrauti
  - Elgon shrew, Crocidura elgonius
  - Elongated shrew, Crocidura elongata
  - Heather shrew, Crocidura erica
  - Fingui white-toothed shrew, Crocidura fingui
  - Fischer's shrew, Crocidura fischeri
  - Greater red musk shrew, Crocidura flavescens
  - Flower's shrew, Crocidura floweri
  - Bornean shrew, Crocidura foetida
  - Fox's shrew, Crocidura foxi
  - Southeast Asian shrew, Crocidura fuliginosa
  - Savanna shrew, Crocidura fulvastra
  - Smoky white-toothed shrew, Crocidura fumosa
  - Bicolored musk shrew, Crocidura fuscomurina
  - Gathorne's shrew, Crocidura gathornei
  - Glass's shrew, Crocidura glassi
  - Gmelin's white-toothed shrew, Crocidura gmelini
  - Goliath shrew, Crocidura goliath
  - Peters's musk shrew, Crocidura gracilipes
  - Large-headed forest shrew, Crocidura grandiceps
  - Greater Mindanao shrew, Crocidura grandis
  - Grasse's shrew, Crocidura grassei
  - Luzon shrew, Crocidura grayi
  - Greenwood's shrew, Crocidura greenwoodi
  - Güldenstädt's shrew, Crocidura gueldenstaedtii
  - Guy's shrew, Crocidura guy
  - Harenna shrew, Crocidura harenna
  - Sinharaja shrew, Crocidura hikmiya*
  - Hildegarde's shrew, Crocidura hildegardeae
  - Hill's shrew, Crocidura hilliana
  - Lesser red musk shrew, Crocidura hirta
  - Andaman spiny shrew, Crocidura hispida
  - Horsfield's shrew, Crocidura horsfieldii
  - Hutan shrew, Crocidura hutanis
  - Indochinese shrew, Crocidura indochinensis
  - Jackson's shrew, Crocidura jacksoni
  - Jenkins' shrew, Crocidura jenkinsi
  - Jouvenet's shrew, Crocidura jouvenetae
  - Katinka's shrew, Crocidura katinka
  - Kego shrew, Crocidura kegoensis
  - Kivu shrew, Crocidura kivuana
  - Lamotte's shrew, Crocidura lamottei
  - Kivu long-haired shrew, Crocidura lanosa
  - Ussuri white-toothed shrew, Crocidura lasiura
  - Latona's shrew, Crocidura latona
  - Sulawesi shrew, Crocidura lea
  - Sumatran giant shrew, Crocidura lepidura
  - Bicolored shrew, Crocidura leucodon
  - Sulawesi tiny shrew, Crocidura levicula
  - Naked-tail shrew, Crocidura littoralis
  - Savanna swamp shrew, Crocidura longipes
  - Lucina's shrew, Crocidura lucina
  - Ludia's shrew, Crocidura ludia
  - Moonshine shrew(Crocidura luna
  - Mauritanian shrew, Crocidura lusitania
  - Lwiro shrew, Crocidura lwiroensis
  - MacArthur's shrew, Crocidura macarthuri
  - MacMillan's shrew, Crocidura macmillani
  - Nyiro shrew, Crocidura macowi
  - Malayan shrew, Crocidura malayana
  - Manenguba shrew, Crocidura manengubae
  - Makwassie musk shrew, Crocidura maquassiensis
  - Swamp musk shrew, Crocidura mariquensis
  - Gracile naked-tailed shrew, Crocidura maurisca
  - Javanese shrew, Crocidura maxi
  - Mduma's shrew, Crocidura mdumai
  - Mindoro shrew, Crocidura mindorus
  - Sri Lankan long-tailed shrew, Crocidura miya
  - Kilimanjaro shrew, Crocidura monax
  - Sunda shrew, Crocidura monticola
  - Montane white-toothed shrew, Crocidura montis
  - Munissi's shrew, Crocidura munissii
  - West African long-tailed shrew, Crocidura muricauda
  - Mossy forest shrew, Crocidura musseri
  - Ugandan musk shrew, Crocidura mutesae
  - Somali dwarf shrew, Crocidura nana
  - Savanna dwarf shrew, Crocidura nanilla
  - Narcondam shrew, Crocidura narcondamica
  - Sumatran white-toothed shrew, Crocidura neglecta
  - Peninsular shrew, Crocidura negligens
  - Negros shrew, Crocidura negrina
  - Newmark's shrew, Crocidura newmarki
  - Nicobar shrew, Crocidura nicobarica
  - Nigerian shrew, Crocidura nigeriae
  - Blackish white-toothed shrew, Crocidura nigricans
  - Black-footed shrew, Crocidura nigripes
  - African black shrew, Crocidura nigrofusca
  - Nimba shrew, Crocidura nimbae
  - Nimba giant shrew, Crocidura nimbasilvanus
  - Sibuyan shrew, Crocidura ninoyi
  - Niobe's shrew, Crocidura niobe
  - West African pygmy shrew, Crocidura obscurior
  - African giant shrew, Crocidura olivieri
  - Oriental shrew, Crocidura orientalis
  - Ryukyu shrew, Crocidura orii
  - North African white-toothed shrew, Crocidura pachyura
  - Palawan shrew, Crocidura palawanensis
  - Panay shrew, Crocidura panayensis
  - Sumatran long-tailed shrew, Crocidura paradoxura
  - Small-footed shrew, Crocidura parvipes
  - Sahelian tiny shrew, Crocidura pasha
  - Pale gray shrew, Crocidura pergrisea
  - Guramba shrew, Crocidura phaeura
  - Dr. Phan Luong shrew, Crocidura phanluongi
  - Phu Hoc shrew, Crocidura phuquocensis
  - Cameroonian shrew, Crocidura picea
  - Pitman's shrew, Crocidura pitmani
  - Flat-headed shrew, Crocidura planiceps
  - Fraser's musk shrew, Crocidura poensis
  - Polia's shrew, Crocidura polia
  - Kashmir white-toothed shrew, Crocidura pullata
  - Rainey's shrew, Crocidura raineyi
  - Negev shrew, Crocidura ramona
  - Chinese white-toothed shrew, Crocidura rapax
  - Egyptian pygmy shrew, Crocidura religiosa
  - Sulawesi white-handed shrew, Crocidura rhoditis
  - Roosevelt's shrew, Crocidura roosevelti
  - Greater white-toothed shrew, Crocidura russula
  - Sa Pa shrew, Crocidura sapaensis
  - Ugandan lowland shrew, Crocidura selina
  - Lesser rock shrew, Crocidura serezkyensis
  - Asian lesser white-toothed shrew, Crocidura shantungensis
  - Siberian shrew, Crocidura sibirica
  - Sicilian shrew, Crocidura sicula
  - Lesser gray-brown musk shrew, Crocidura silacea
  - Mebado white-toothed shrew, Crocidura similturba
  - Desert musk shrew, Crocidura smithii
  - Sokolov's shrew, Crocidura sokolovi
  - Somali shrew, Crocidura somalica
  - Narrow-headed shrew, Crocidura stenocephala
  - Lesser white-toothed shrew, Crocidura suaveolens
  - Iranian shrew, Crocidura susiana
  - Taiwanese gray shrew, Crocidura tanakae
  - Tanzanian shrew, Crocidura tansaniana
  - Tarella shrew, Crocidura tarella
  - Saharan shrew, Crocidura tarfayensis
  - Telford's shrew, Crocidura telfordi
  - Timor shrew, Crocidura tenuis
  - Thalia's shrew, Crocidura thalia
  - Therese's shrew, Crocidura theresae
  - São Tomé shrew, Crocidura thomensis
  - Christmas Island shrew, Crocidura trichura
  - Turbo shrew, Crocidura turba
  - Ultimate shrew, Crocidura ultima
  - Javan ghost shrew, Crocidura umbra
  - Usambara shrew, Crocidura usambarae
  - Savanna path shrew, Crocidura viaria
  - Mamfe shrew, Crocidura virgata
  - Voi shrew, Crocidura voi
  - Voracious shrew, Crocidura vorax
  - Banka shrew, Crocidura vosmaeri
  - Lesser Ryukyu shrew, Crocidura watasei
  - Whitaker's shrew, Crocidura whitakeri
  - Wimmer's shrew, Crocidura wimmeri
  - Hainan Island shrew, Crocidura wuchihensis
  - Xanthippe's shrew, Crocidura xantippe
  - Beletta shrew, Crocidura yaldeni
  - Yankari shrew, Crocidura yankariensis
  - Mikhail Zaitsev's shrew, Crocidura zaitsevi*
  - Zaphir's shrew, Crocidura zaphiri
  - Zarudny's rock shrew, Crocidura zarudnyi
  - Upemba shrew, Crocidura zimmeri
  - Cretan shrew, Crocidura zimmermanni
- Genus Diplomesodon
  - Piebald shrew, Diplomesodon pulchellum
- Genus Feroculus
  - Kelaart's long-clawed shrew, Feroculus feroculus
- Genus Palawanosorex
  - Palawan moss shrew, Palawanosorex muscorum
- Genus Paracrocidura (large-headed shrews)
  - Grauer's large-headed shrew, Paracrocidura graueri
  - Greater large-headed shrew, Paracrocidura maxima
  - Lesser large-headed shrew, Paracrocidura schoutedeni
- Genus Ruwenzorisorex
  - Ruwenzori shrew, Ruwenzorisorex suncoides
- Genus Scutisorex (hero shrews)
  - Armored shrew, Scutisorex somereni
  - Thor's hero shrew, Scutisorex thori
- Genus Solisorex
  - Pearson's long-clawed shrew, Solisorex pearsoni
- Genus Suncus
  - Taita shrew, Suncus aequatorius
  - Black shrew, Suncus ater
  - Day's shrew, Suncus dayi
  - Etruscan shrew, Suncus etruscus
  - Sri Lankan shrew, Suncus fellowesgordoni
  - Bornean pygmy shrew, Suncus hosei
  - Hutu-Tutsi dwarf shrew, Suncus hututsi
  - Least dwarf shrew, Suncus infinitesimus
  - Greater dwarf shrew, Suncus lixa
  - Madagascan pygmy shrew, Suncus madagascariensis
  - Malayan pygmy shrew, Suncus malayanus
  - Climbing shrew, Suncus megalurus
  - Flores shrew, Suncus mertensi
  - Asian highland shrew, Suncus montanus
  - Asian house shrew, Suncus murinus
  - Remy's pygmy shrew, Suncus remyi
  - Anderson's shrew, Suncus stoliczkanus
  - Lesser dwarf shrew, Suncus varilla
  - Jungle shrew, Suncus zeylanicus
- Genus Sylvisorex, forest shrews
  - Akaibe's forest shrew, Sylvisorex akaibei
  - Cameroonian forest shrew, Sylvisorex cameruniensis
  - Corbet's forest shrew, Sylvisorex corbeti
  - Grant's forest shrew, Sylvisorex granti
  - Howell's forest shrew, Sylvisorex howelli
  - Bioko forest shrew, Sylvisorex isabellae
  - Johnston's forest shrew, Sylvisorex johnstoni
  - Kongana shrew, Sylvisorex konganensis
  - Moon forest shrew, Sylvisorex lunaris
  - Mount Cameroon forest shrew, Sylvisorex morio
  - Greater forest shrew, Sylvisorex ollula
  - Lesser forest shrew, Sylvisorex oriundus
  - Rain forest shrew, Sylvisorex pluvialis
  - Bamenda forest shrew, Sylvisorex silvanorum
  - Volcano shrew, Sylvisorex vulcanorum
- Genus †Tikitherium (dubious)
  - Tikitherium copei

== See also ==
- Imjin virus
