= Crocidura caudipilosa =

Conservation status
- Least Concern (IUCN 3.1)

Scientific classification
- Kingdom: Animalia
- Phylum: Chordata
- Class: Mammalia
- Order: Eulipotyphla
- Family: Soricidae
- Genus: Crocidura
- Species: C. caudipilosa

Binomial name
- Crocidura caudipilosa Esselstyn, Achmadi, Handika, Giarla, & Rowe, 2019

Species of shrew

Crocidura caudipilosa, the hairy-tailed white-toothed shrew, is a species of white-toothed shrew endemic to Sulawesi, Indonesia.
