= Dusky shrew =

Dusky shrew may refer to one of at least three species of shrew:

- Sorex isodon, also called taiga shrew
- Sorex monticolus, also called the montane shrew
- Crocidura pullata, also called the Kashmir white-toothed shrew
