= Crocidura brevicauda =

Conservation status
- Vulnerable (IUCN 3.1)

Scientific classification
- Kingdom: Animalia
- Phylum: Chordata
- Class: Mammalia
- Order: Eulipotyphla
- Family: Soricidae
- Genus: Crocidura
- Species: C. brevicauda

Binomial name
- Crocidura brevicauda Esselstyn, Achmadi, Handika, Swanson, Giarla, & Rowe, 2021

Species of mammal

Crocidura brevicauda, the short-tailed white-toothed shrew, is a vulnerable species of white-toothed shrew. It is endemic to Sulawesi Indonesia.
