= Dhofar shrew =

Conservation status
- Data Deficient (IUCN 3.1)

Scientific classification
- Kingdom: Animalia
- Phylum: Chordata
- Class: Mammalia
- Order: Eulipotyphla
- Family: Soricidae
- Genus: Crocidura
- Species: C. dhofarensis

Binomial name
- Crocidura dhofarensis Hutterer & Harrison, 1988

Species of mammal

The Dhofar shrew (Crocidura dhofarensis), also known as the Dhofar white-toothed shrew, is a species of shrew belonging to the family Soricidae. This shrew is found in the southwestern Arabian peninsula.

== Taxonomy ==
The Dhofar shrew was first formally described as Crocidura somalica dhofarensis in 1988 by the German mammalogist Rainer Hutterer and the English zoologist David Lakin Harrison with its type locality given as Khadrafi, Dhofar in Oman at an altitude of 620 m (2,030 ft) at 16°42'N, 53°09'E. In 1993 Hutterer reclassified it as a valid species, C. dhofarensis. This shrew is a white-toothed shrew belonging to the genus Crocidura in the subfamily Crocidurinae in theshrew family Soricidae in the order Eulipotyphla.

== Description ==
The Dhofar shrew has dark brown fur above and pale grey fur on its belly with a clear, but not sharp, delineation between these two areas on the flanks. There is a covering of short white fur in the chin, the tail is greyish-brown dorsally and pale grey ventrally and has long hairs loosely scattered over its length except for its tip. The feet have a covering of brown hair and the claws are whitish. It has a slender skull, with a concavity at its lambda, with a narrow snout. This species has an overall lengthof 12 cm (4.7 in) and a weight of 10 g (0.35 oz).

== Distribution and habitat ==
The Dhofar shrew is endemic to southwestern Arabia where it has been recorded from Dhofar in Oman, from Yemen and Saudi Arabia. The specimens in yelem were collected from short grass with scatteted trees and shrubs, the holotype from Oman was caught in long grass, while the Saudi Arabian specimens where caught in an irrigated banana plantation.
