= Phu Hoc shrew =

Conservation status
- Data Deficient (IUCN 3.1)

Scientific classification
- Kingdom: Animalia
- Phylum: Chordata
- Class: Mammalia
- Order: Eulipotyphla
- Family: Soricidae
- Genus: Crocidura
- Species: C. phuquocensis

Binomial name
- Crocidura phuquocensis Abramov, Jenkins, Rozhnov & Kalinin, 2008

Species of mammal

The Phu Hoc shrew (Crocidura phuquocensis) is a species of white-toothed shrew native to the island of Phú Quốc, Vietnam. The species was first described by Abramov et al. in 2008. The species' haplogroup is most closely related to the Southeast Asian shrew (C. fuliginosa) and C. dracula.
