= Crocidura solita =

Conservation status
- Near Threatened (IUCN 3.1)

Scientific classification
- Kingdom: Animalia
- Phylum: Chordata
- Class: Mammalia
- Order: Eulipotyphla
- Family: Soricidae
- Genus: Crocidura
- Species: C. solita

Binomial name
- Crocidura solita Esselstyn, Achmadi, Handika, Swanson, Giarla, & Rowe, 2021

Species of mammal

Crocidura solita, the west-central Sulawesi white-toothed shrew, is a near threatened species of white-toothed shrew. It is endemic to Sulawesi Indonesia.
