= Dracula shrew =

Dracula Shrew

Scientific classification
- Domain: Eukaryota
- Kingdom: Animalia
- Phylum: Chordata
- Class: Mammalia
- Order: Eulipotyphla
- Family: Soricidae
- Genus: Crocidura
- Species: C. dracula

Binomial name
- Crocidura dracula Taylor, 1912

Synonyms
- Crocidura fuliginosa dracula

Species of mammal

The Dracula shrew (Crocidura dracula), also known as the large white-toothed shrew, is a species of mammal in the family Soricidae. It is found in Vietnam, Laos, and adjacent southern China, with possible range extension into Cambodia east of the Mekong River. Because it is so visually similar to the Southeast Asian shrew, it has historically been considered part of the same species complex and the range delineation between the two species is still being resolved. Recent genetic evidence strongly supports that the Dracula shrew is in fact a uniquely diverged species.

== Description ==
The Dracula shrew is a large and long-tailed shrew with a head-and-body length of between 78 and 95 mm (3.1 and 3.7 in) and a tail generally at least 80% of that length typically between 65 and 80 mm (2.6 and 3.1 in). The coloring is smoke brown to dark grey black above fading to dark grey below and with dull white feet, the tail is often dark above and lighter below.

== Ecology ==
Like other members of the shrew subfamily Crocurinae, the Dracula shrew is an insectivore.
