= Palawan moss shrew =

Scientific classification
- Kingdom: Animalia
- Phylum: Chordata
- Class: Mammalia
- Order: Eulipotyphla
- Family: Soricidae
- Genus: Palawanosorex; Hutterer et al., 2018
- Species: P. muscorum

Binomial name
- Palawanosorex muscorum Hutterer et al., 2018

Species of mammal

The Palawan moss shrew (Palawanosorex muscorum) is a species of shrew found on Mount Mantalingajan in the Philippines. The shrew is one of two other unique species only found on Mount Mantalingajan.

== See also ==
- Palawan shrew
