= Crocidura australis =

Conservation status
- Endangered (IUCN 3.1)

Scientific classification
- Kingdom: Animalia
- Phylum: Chordata
- Class: Mammalia
- Order: Eulipotyphla
- Family: Soricidae
- Genus: Crocidura
- Species: C. australis

Binomial name
- Crocidura australis Esselstyn, Achmadi, Handika, Swanson, Giarla, & Rowe, 2021

Species of mammal

Crocidura australis, the southwest peninsula white-toothed shrew, is an endangered species of white-toothed shrew. It is endemic to Sulawesi Indonesia.
