= Wimmer's shrew =

Conservation status
- Vulnerable (IUCN 3.1)

Scientific classification
- Kingdom: Animalia
- Phylum: Chordata
- Class: Mammalia
- Order: Eulipotyphla
- Family: Soricidae
- Genus: Crocidura
- Species: C. wimmeri

Binomial name
- Crocidura wimmeri Heim de Balsac & Aellen, 1958
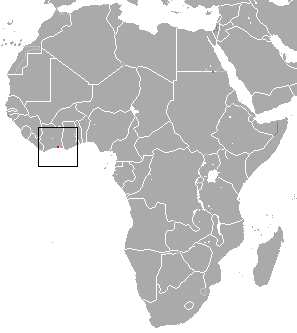
- Wimmer's shrew range

Species of mammal

Wimmer's shrew (Crocidura wimmeri) is a white-toothed shrew found only in Côte d'Ivoire. It is listed as a vulnerable species due to habitat loss and restricted range.

Shrew species assignments are a challenge due to their strong phenotypic similarities, which is why the C. wimmeri had been considered to be extinct in 1976 until its rediscovery in 2013. More precisely, the species richness and diversity of rodents and shrews in the primary forest, secondary forest, and swamps (Kadjo) were assessed using Sherman and Longworth traps, which are common traps used to catch live animals. This species is often hard to identify because of shrews' strong phenotypic similarities. The study examined the diversity and distribution of small mammals in Banco National Park. Four individuals of the severely endangered Wimmer's shrew were collected for the investigation. Researchers used the Cox regression model to determine Wimmer shrew sightings. It was found that the Wimmer shrew was one of the most likely mammals to be rediscovered. The species inhabits the leaf litter of lowland evergreen forests and prefers areas with dense undergrowth and high humidity, suggesting it is dependent on undisturbed primary forest environments.
