= Narrow-headed shrew =

Conservation status
- Vulnerable (IUCN 3.1)

Scientific classification
- Kingdom: Animalia
- Phylum: Chordata
- Class: Mammalia
- Order: Eulipotyphla
- Family: Soricidae
- Genus: Crocidura
- Species: C. stenocephala

Binomial name
- Crocidura stenocephala Dieterlen & Heim de Balsac, 1979
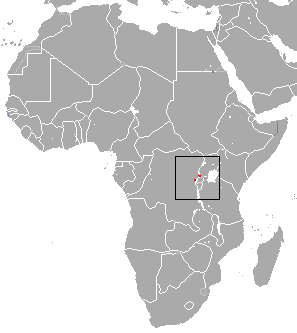
- Kahuzi swamp shrew range

Species of mammal

The narrow-headed shrew or Kahuzi swamp white-toothed shrew (Crocidura stenocephala) is a species of white-toothed shrew in the family Soricidae. It is found in the Democratic Republic of the Congo and Uganda. Its natural habitat is swamps. It is threatened by habitat loss.
