= Negros shrew =

Conservation status
- Endangered (IUCN 3.1)

Scientific classification
- Kingdom: Animalia
- Phylum: Chordata
- Class: Mammalia
- Order: Eulipotyphla
- Family: Soricidae
- Genus: Crocidura
- Species: C. negrina

Binomial name
- Crocidura negrina Rabor, 1952
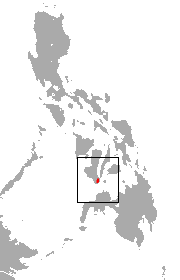
- Negros shrew range

Species of mammal

The Negros shrew (Crocidura negrina) is a white-toothed shrew found only on the island of Negros in the Philippines. It is locally called the katsurí and is listed as an endangered species due to habitat loss and a restricted range.
