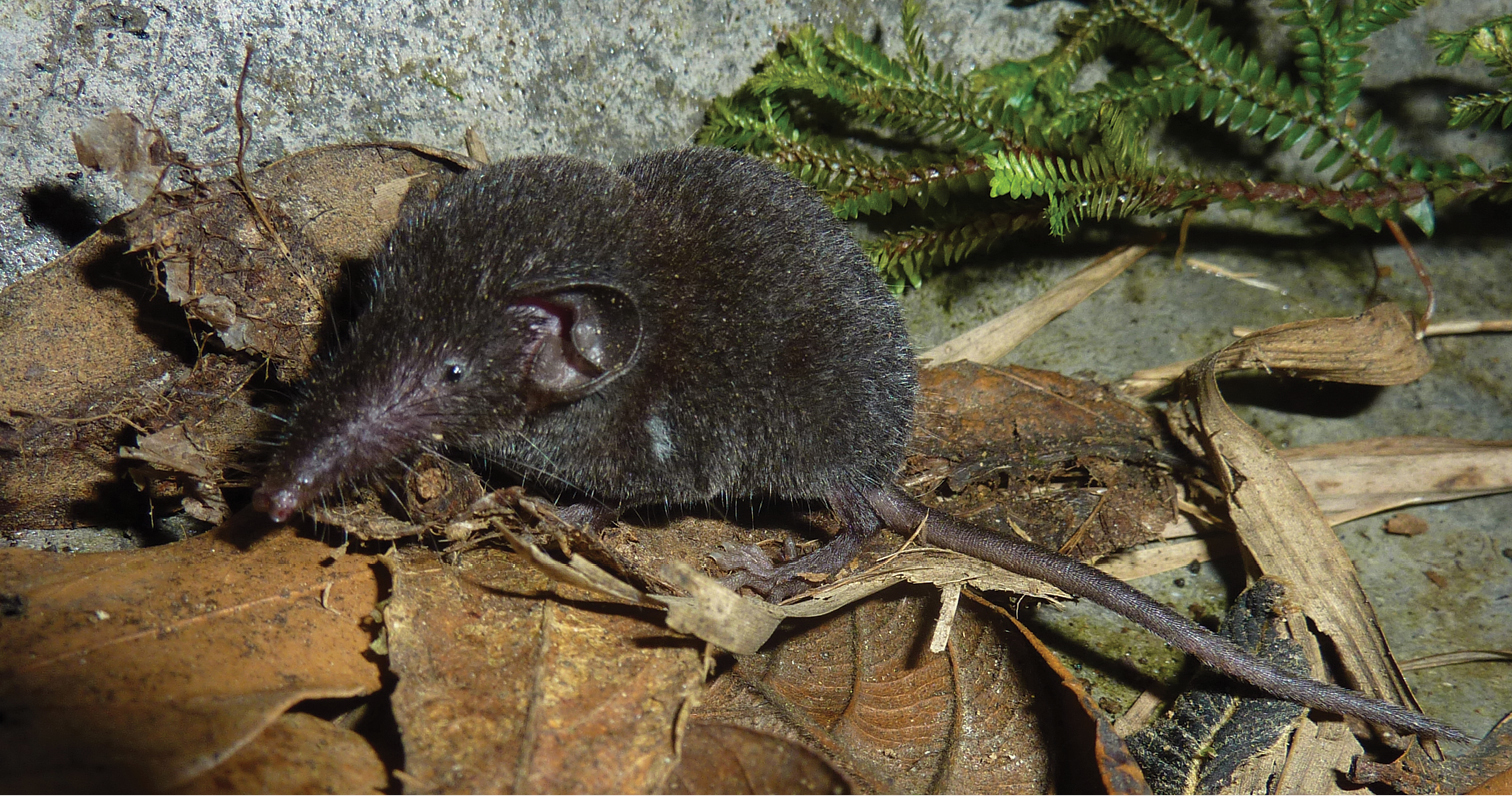
- Adult male

Conservation status
- Data Deficient (IUCN 3.1)

Scientific classification
- Kingdom: Animalia
- Phylum: Chordata
- Class: Mammalia
- Order: Eulipotyphla
- Family: Soricidae
- Genus: Crocidura
- Species: C. sapaensis

Binomial name
- Crocidura sapaensis Jenkins, 2013

= Crocidura sapaensis =

Species of shrew

Crocidura sapaensis is a species of white-toothed shrew native to northern Vietnam. It was first described in 2013 and its specific name derives from the Sa Pa where it was discovered.

== Description ==
Crocidura sapaensis is very similar in appearance to the Hainan Island shrew (Crocidura wuchihensis) and it was only recognised as a separate species in 2013 after molecular analysis. This shows that C. sapaensis is more closely related to the Indochinese shrew (Crocidura indochinensis), however these two species are more morphologically distinct. There may have been convergence between C. wuchihensis and C. sapaensis due to them occupying similar ecological niches.

Crocidura sapaensis is a small shrew with a relatively long tail. Its head and body length ranges from 50 to 65 mm (1.97 to 2.56 in) and its tail length from 37 to 47 mm (1.46 to 1.85 in). Its short fur is a dark greyish-brown colour. The tail is a similar colour but slightly paler underneath. The most significant morphological difference between this species and C. wuchihensis is the structure of the third molar in the lower jaw.

== Distribution and habitat ==
Crocidura sapaensis is found in several different types of habitat in the vicinity of Tram Ton Station of Hoang Lien National Park. These include primary forest with large trees, mixed evergreen forests, clearings, grassy glades and the wooded banks of streams. It was most common in slightly disturbed, mixed forests and was found at altitudes of between 1,930 and 2,200 m (6,330 and 7,220 ft) above sea level.

== Biology ==
At all times of year, there seem to be more males than females of this species. Pregnant females were found between May and July and the average size of litter was three.
