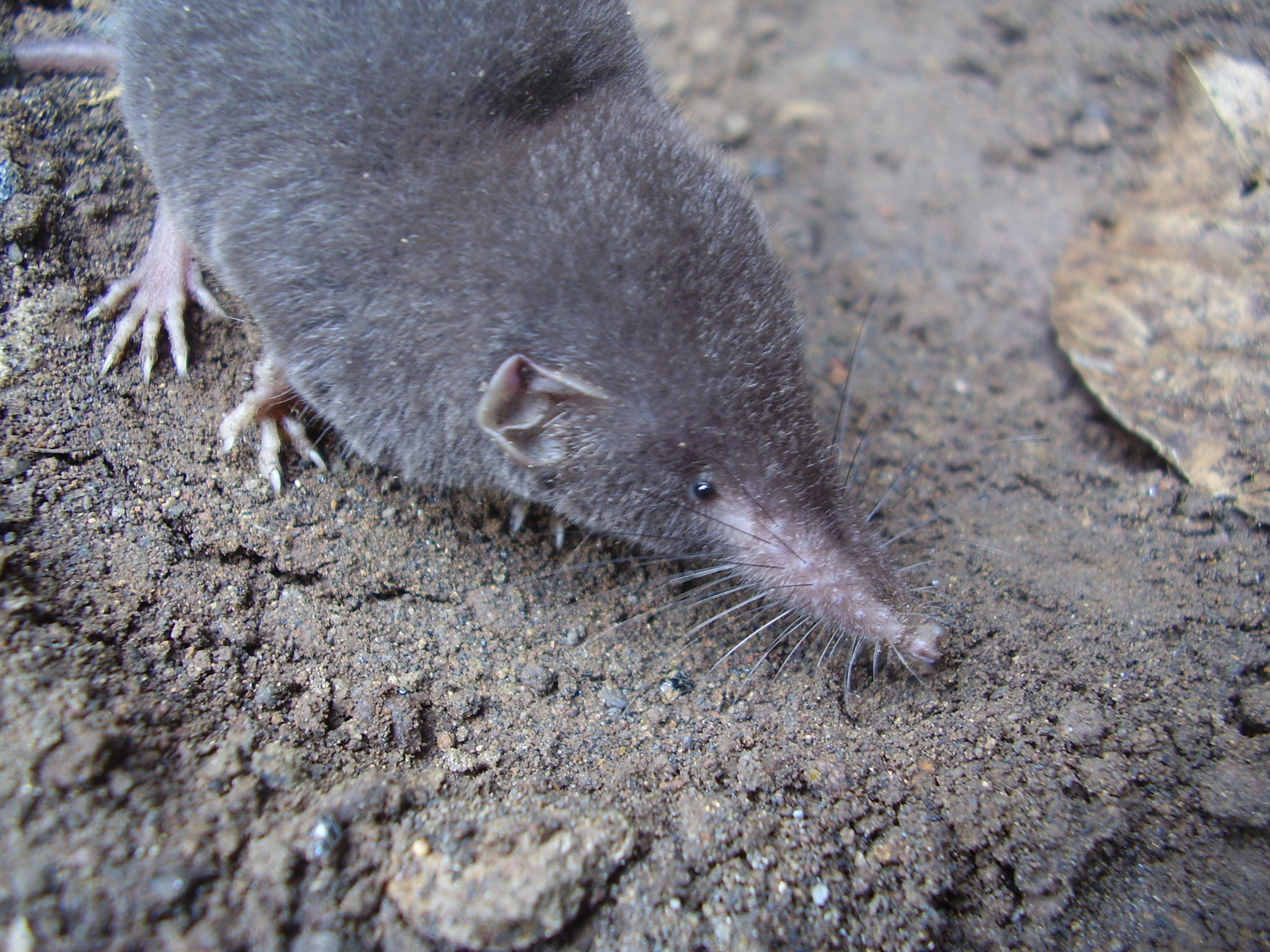

Conservation status
- Endangered (IUCN 3.1)

Scientific classification
- Kingdom: Animalia
- Phylum: Chordata
- Class: Mammalia
- Order: Eulipotyphla
- Family: Soricidae
- Genus: Crocidura
- Species: C. thomensis

Binomial name
- Crocidura thomensis (Bocage, 1887)
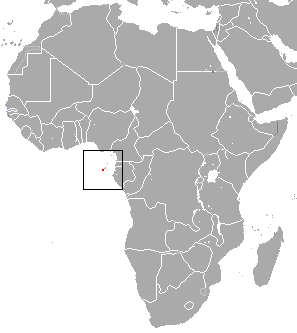
- São Tomé shrew range

= São Tomé shrew =

Species of mammal

The São Tomé shrew (Crocidura thomensis) is a white-toothed shrew about 3.0 in (7.6 cm) long found only on São Tomé Island, São Tomé and Príncipe. It is listed as a critically endangered species due to habitat loss and a restricted range. It was discovered in 1886. The population continues to decrease, making these animals rare. It is found only on São Tomé Island, a small island that is actually a shield volcano that rises out of the Atlantic Ocean.

== Threats ==
Deforestation, the primary cause of endangerment of the São Tomé shrew, results in loss of their primary habitat which affects them because of their small size and thus limited range. Unintentional and intentional introduction of other invasive species has taken a toll on their existence because of the increased competition for food.

== Conservation efforts ==
Conservation efforts have largely failed because very little information is available on the São Tomé shrew. In 2004 the International Union for Conservation of Nature listed them as critically endangered, because they were only known from a single area of São Tomé, where their habitat is tropical montane moist forest. Degradation of the forest, with the creation of more gardens and farmland, is thought to be the most important factor behind their decreasing numbers. Between 2002 and 2014 23 animals were recorded at 15 new sites, which has contributed to a reassessment in 2016 as endangered species.
