= Taita shrew =

Conservation status
- Endangered (IUCN 3.1)

Scientific classification
- Kingdom: Animalia
- Phylum: Chordata
- Class: Mammalia
- Infraclass: Placentalia
- Order: Eulipotyphla
- Family: Soricidae
- Genus: Suncus
- Species: S. aequatorius

Binomial name
- Suncus aequatorius (Heller, 1912)
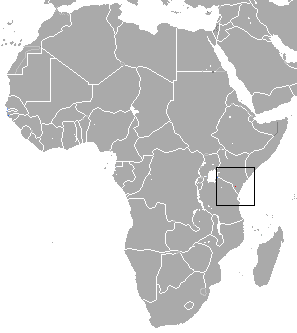
- Habitat of the Taita Shrew in Kenya.

Species of mammal

The Taita shrew (Suncus aequatorius) is an extant species of white-toothed shrew from two localities in the Taita Hills mountain range in the Taita-Taveta District of southwestern Kenya. Given the continuing decline in the quality of this habitat, and the limitations in its range, the IUCN recognises the shrew as an endangered species.
