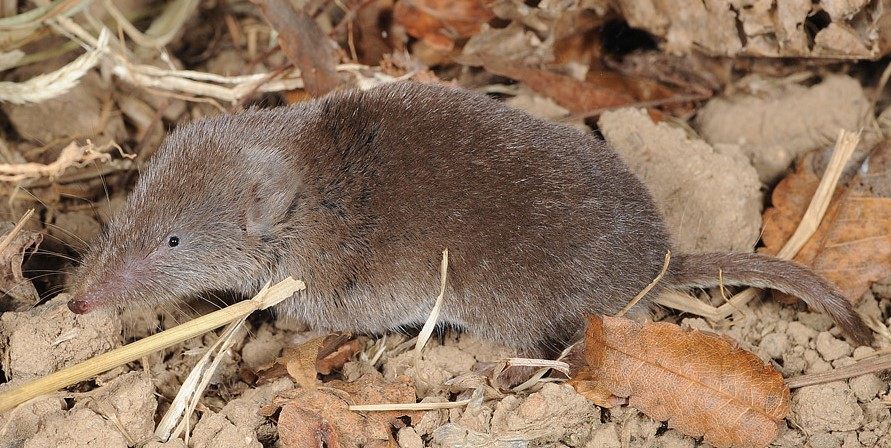

Conservation status
- Least Concern (IUCN 3.1)

Scientific classification
- Kingdom: Animalia
- Phylum: Chordata
- Class: Mammalia
- Order: Eulipotyphla
- Family: Soricidae
- Genus: Crocidura
- Species: C. lasiura

Binomial name
- Crocidura lasiura (Dobson, 1890)
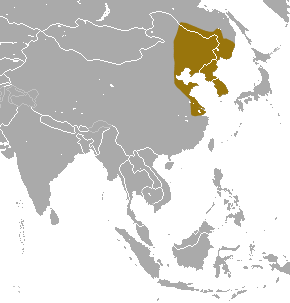
- Ussuri white-toothed shrew range

= Ussuri white-toothed shrew =

Species of mammal

The Ussuri white-toothed shrew (Crocidura lasiura) is a species of musk shrew found on the mainland Northeast Asia. It is common and widespread, and is one of the largest shrews found in the region, with adult weight of 14–25 g (0.49–0.88 oz). It should not be confused with the related Ussuri shrew (Sorex mirabilis).
