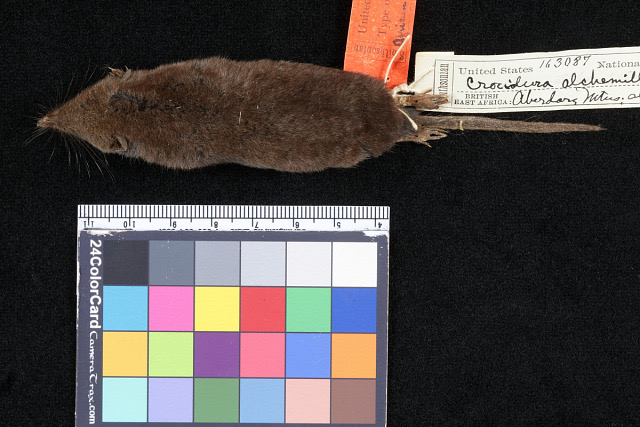

Conservation status
- Least Concern (IUCN 3.1)

Scientific classification
- Kingdom: Animalia
- Phylum: Chordata
- Class: Mammalia
- Infraclass: Placentalia
- Order: Eulipotyphla
- Family: Soricidae
- Genus: Crocidura
- Species: C. fumosa

Binomial name
- Crocidura fumosa Thomas, 1904
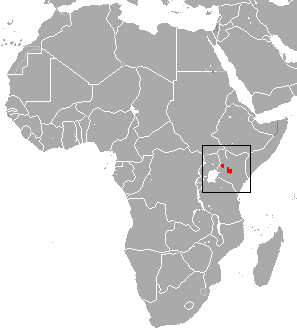
- Smoky white-toothed shrew range

= Smoky white-toothed shrew =

Species of mammal

The smoky white-toothed shrew (Crocidura fumosa) is a species of mammal in the family Soricidae. It is endemic to Kenya. Its natural habitat is subtropical or tropical moist montane forests.
