= Zaphir's shrew =

Conservation status
- Data Deficient (IUCN 3.1)

Scientific classification
- Kingdom: Animalia
- Phylum: Chordata
- Class: Mammalia
- Order: Eulipotyphla
- Family: Soricidae
- Genus: Crocidura
- Species: C. zaphiri

Binomial name
- Crocidura zaphiri Dollman, 1915
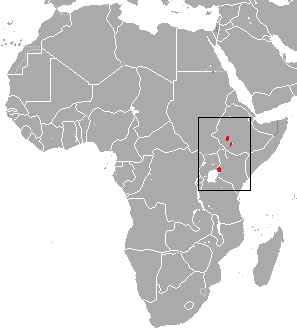
- Zaphir's shrew range

Species of mammal

Zaphir's shrew (Crocidura zaphiri) is a species of mammal in the family Soricidae. It is found in Ethiopia and Kenya. Its natural habitats are subtropical and tropical dry and moist lowland forests.

== Sources ==
- Gerrie, R.; Kennerley, R. (2017) [errata version of 2016 assessment]. "Crocidura zaphiri". IUCN Red List of Threatened Species. 2016 e.T41368A115182270. doi:10.2305/IUCN.UK.2016-3.RLTS.T41368A22309158.en.
