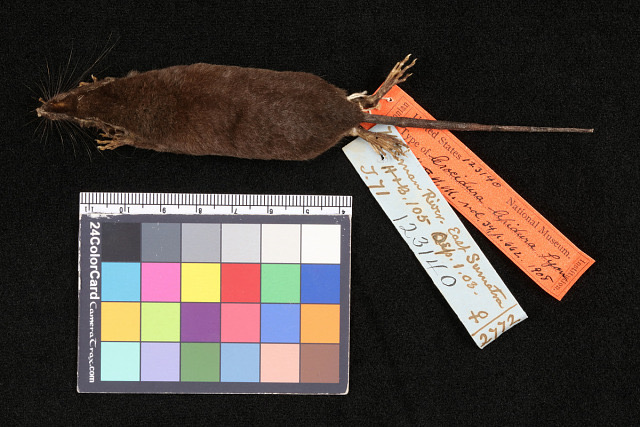
- specimen

Conservation status
- Least Concern (IUCN 3.1)

Scientific classification
- Kingdom: Animalia
- Phylum: Chordata
- Class: Mammalia
- Infraclass: Placentalia
- Order: Eulipotyphla
- Family: Soricidae
- Genus: Crocidura
- Species: C. lepidura

Binomial name
- Crocidura lepidura Lyon, 1908
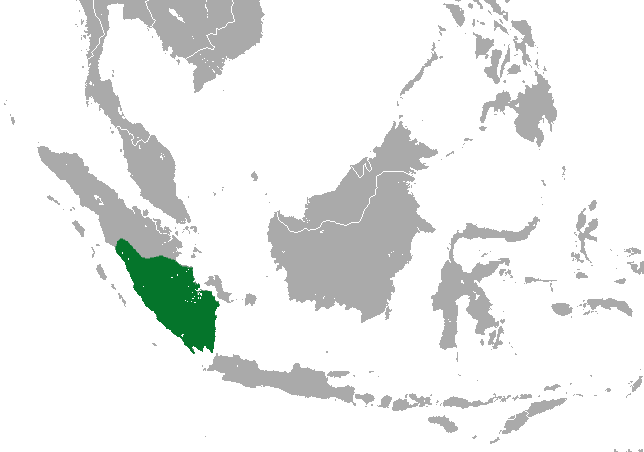
- Sumatran giant shrew range

= Sumatran giant shrew =

Species of mammal

The Sumatran giant shrew (Crocidura lepidura) is a shrew of the genus Crocidura. It is native to the Indonesian island of Sumatra, where it is found both in the rainforests to the west of the island and in the hillsides in the south and east. The shrew can be found up to approximately 2,000 metres (6,600 ft) above sea level but is most common at 1,500–1,800 metres (4,900–5,900 ft) above sea level.
