= Kongana shrew =

Conservation status
- Data Deficient (IUCN 3.1)

Scientific classification
- Kingdom: Animalia
- Phylum: Chordata
- Class: Mammalia
- Order: Eulipotyphla
- Family: Soricidae
- Genus: Sylvisorex
- Species: S. konganensis

Binomial name
- Sylvisorex konganensis Ray & Hutterer, 1996
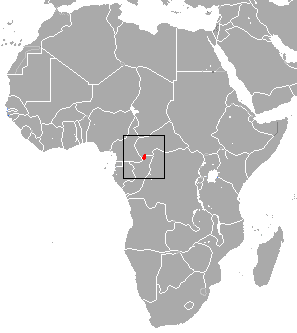
- Kongana shrew range

Species of mammal

The Kongana shrew (Sylvisorex konganensis) is a species of mammal in the family Soricidae endemic to Central African Republic. Its natural habitat is subtropical or tropical moist lowland forests.
