= Latona's shrew =

Conservation status
- Least Concern (IUCN 3.1)

Scientific classification
- Kingdom: Animalia
- Phylum: Chordata
- Class: Mammalia
- Order: Eulipotyphla
- Family: Soricidae
- Genus: Crocidura
- Species: C. latona

Binomial name
- Crocidura latona Hollister, 1916
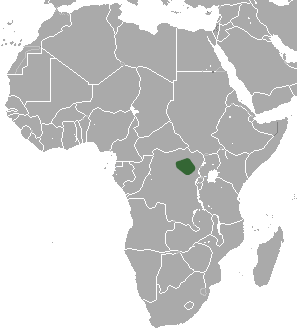
- Latona's shrew range

Species of mammal

Latona's shrew (Crocidura latona) is a species of shrew in the genus Crocidura. It is endemic to Democratic Republic of the Congo. Its natural habitat is subtropical or tropical moist lowland forests.
