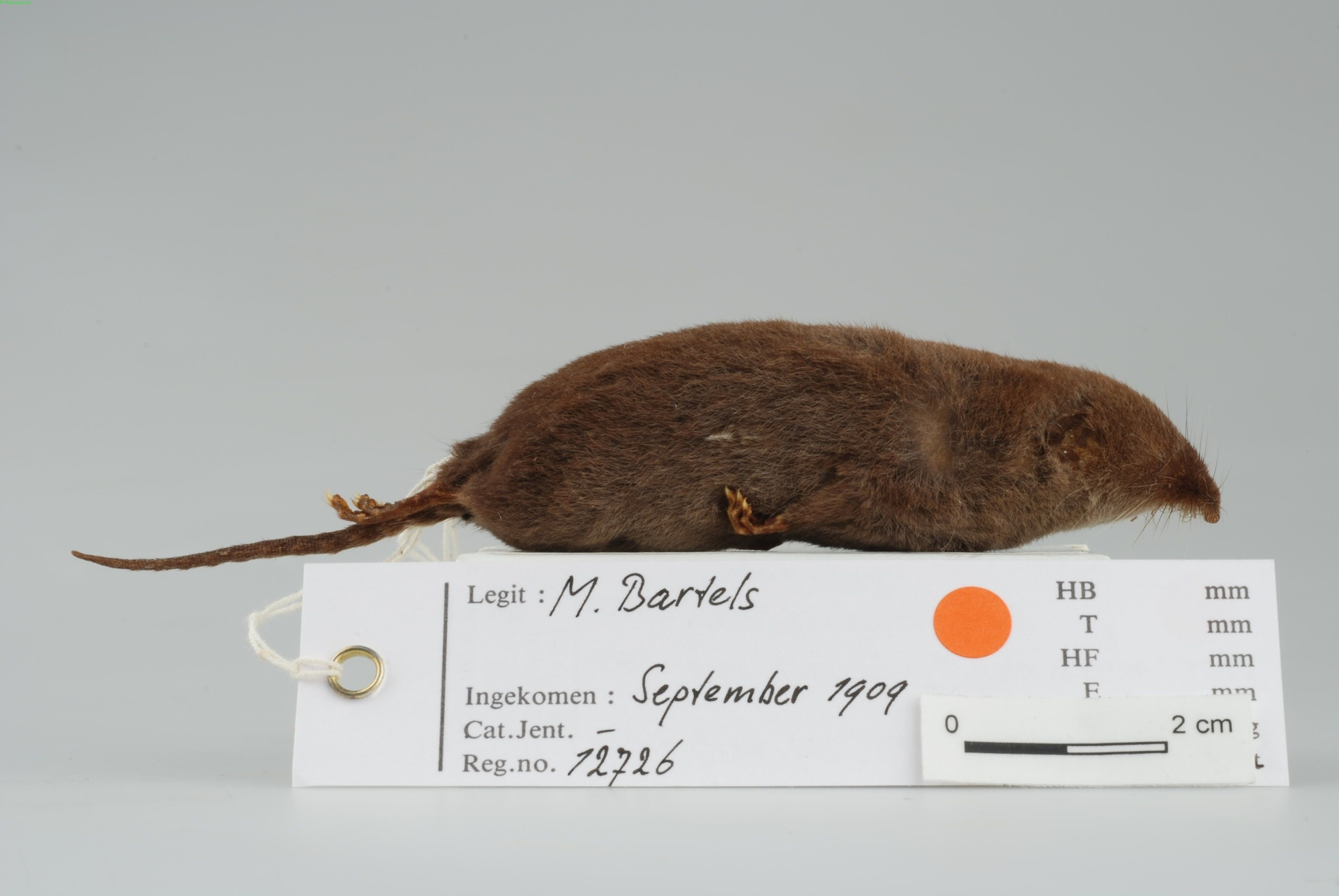
- Crocidura brunnea stuffed specimen

Conservation status
- Least Concern (IUCN 3.1)

Scientific classification
- Kingdom: Animalia
- Phylum: Chordata
- Class: Mammalia
- Order: Eulipotyphla
- Family: Soricidae
- Genus: Crocidura
- Species: C. brunnea

Binomial name
- Crocidura brunnea Jentink, 1888
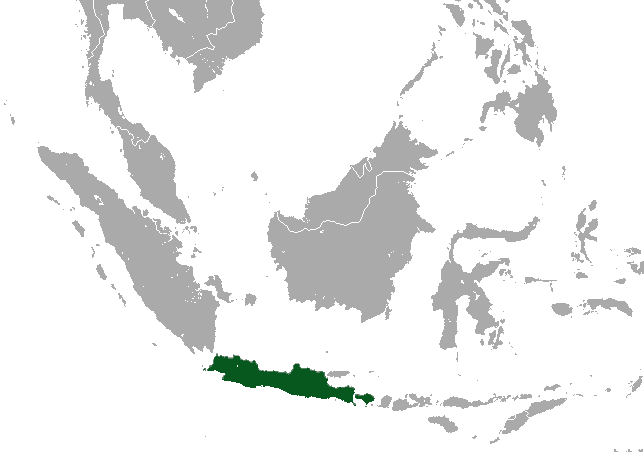
- Thick-tailed shrew range

= Thick-tailed shrew =

Species of mammal

The thick-tailed shrew (Crocidura brunnea) is a species of mammal in the family Soricidae. It is found on the islands of Java and Bali in Indonesia.
