= Manenguba shrew =

Conservation status
- Vulnerable (IUCN 3.1)

Scientific classification
- Kingdom: Animalia
- Phylum: Chordata
- Class: Mammalia
- Order: Eulipotyphla
- Family: Soricidae
- Genus: Crocidura
- Species: C. manengubae

Binomial name
- Crocidura manengubae Hutterer, 1982
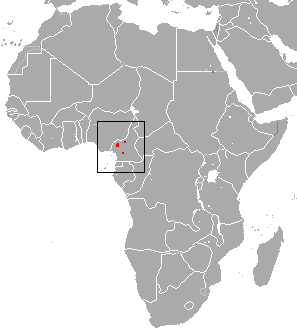
- Manenguba shrew range

Species of mammal

The Manenguba shrew (Crocidura manengubae) is a species of mammal in the family Soricidae. It is endemic to Cameroon. Its natural habitat is subtropical or tropical moist montane forests.
