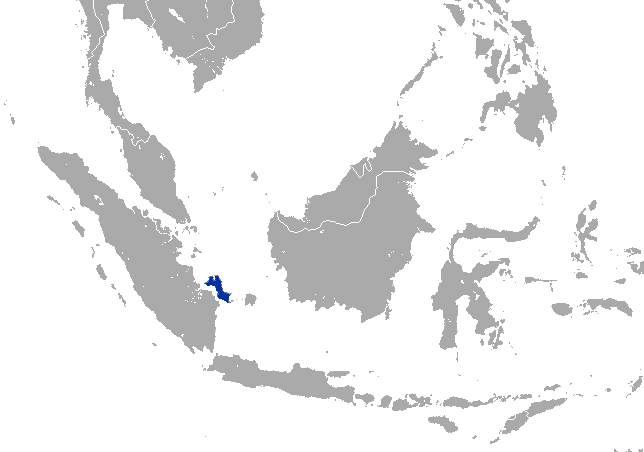
- Banka shrew range

Conservation status
- Data Deficient (IUCN 3.1)

Scientific classification
- Kingdom: Animalia
- Phylum: Chordata
- Class: Mammalia
- Order: Eulipotyphla
- Family: Soricidae
- Genus: Crocidura
- Species: C. vosmaeri

Binomial name
- Crocidura vosmaeri Jentink, 1888

= Banka shrew =

Species of mammal

The Banka shrew (Crocidura vosmaeri) is a species of mammal in the family Soricidae. It is only known from the Bangka Island in Indonesia and possibly Sumatra. It lives in primary and secondary lowland forest and it is not clear if can adapt to human settlements such as plantations. It is threatened by forest loss for logging, expanding plantations such as palm oil and mining.
