= Fischer's shrew =

Conservation status
- Data Deficient (IUCN 3.1)

Scientific classification
- Kingdom: Animalia
- Phylum: Chordata
- Class: Mammalia
- Order: Eulipotyphla
- Family: Soricidae
- Genus: Crocidura
- Species: C. fischeri

Binomial name
- Crocidura fischeri Pagenstecher, 1885
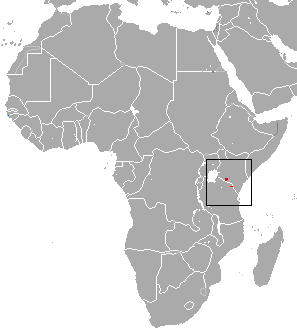
- Fischer's shrew range

Species of mammal

Fischer's shrew (Crocidura fischeri) is a species of mammal in the family Soricidae. It is found in Kenya and Tanzania. Its natural habitat is dry savanna.

== Sources ==
- Gerrie, R.; Kennerley, R. (2017) [errata version of 2016 assessment]. "Crocidura fischeri". IUCN Red List of Threatened Species. 2016 e.T5627A115078492. doi:10.2305/IUCN.UK.2016-3.RLTS.T5627A22300055.en.
