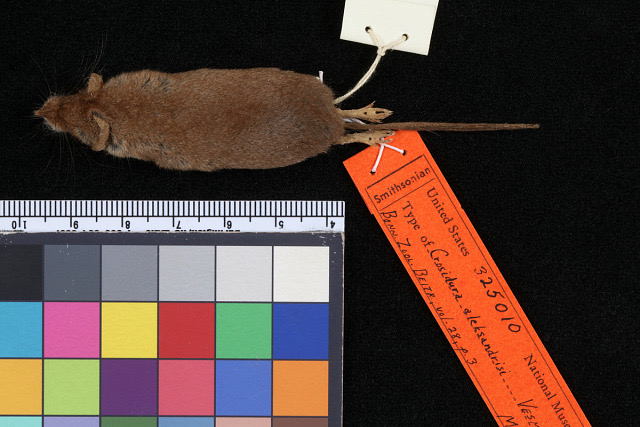
- Taxidermied specimen

Conservation status
- Least Concern (IUCN 3.1)

Scientific classification
- Kingdom: Animalia
- Phylum: Chordata
- Class: Mammalia
- Order: Eulipotyphla
- Family: Soricidae
- Genus: Crocidura
- Species: C. aleksandrisi

Binomial name
- Crocidura aleksandrisi Vesmanis, 1977
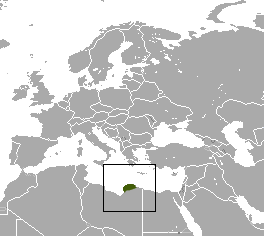
- Cyrenaica shrew range

= Cyrenaica shrew =

Species of mammal

The Cyrenaica shrew or Alexander's shrew (Crocidura aleksandrisi) is a species of white-toothed shrew in the family Soricidae. It is endemic to Libya.

The Cyrenaica shrew is a small shrew which is very similar to the widespread lesser white-toothed shrew of Europe and Asia, both species have teeth which lack the red colouration on the crowns of the teeth. They are small mammals with paler fur underneath and a pointed muzzle and a long tail.

The Cyrenaica shrew is endemic to Libya, specifically to the province of Cyrenaica where it is found from sea level up to 200 to 300 m. Specimens were collected from the 1960s through the 1990s, and there were no signs that the population had declined or that there were any major threats to the species in its restricted range and is therefore assessed as Least Concern.

The Cyrenaica shrew is found in Mediterranean vegetation such as scrub and also in littoral and rocky areas. It is thought to occur in degraded habitats, and to be largely terrestrial and nocturnal. It is very closely related to the lesser white-toothed shrew and is likely to share that species rather sociable habits and to "caravan", i.e. the young follow their mother in a line holding their predecessor's tail in their mouth so that the family stays together while foraging or seeking shelter. It seems to be relatively common and its skulls are frequently found in the pellets of owls collected from within their range. The group of shrews this species belongs to are also known as "musk shrews" because of the musky scented secretions they produce and use to scent mark their territories by dragging their bellies along the ground.
