= Congo white-toothed shrew =

Conservation status
- Least Concern (IUCN 3.1)

Scientific classification
- Kingdom: Animalia
- Phylum: Chordata
- Class: Mammalia
- Order: Eulipotyphla
- Family: Soricidae
- Genus: Crocidura
- Species: C. congobelgica

Binomial name
- Crocidura congobelgica Hollister, 1916
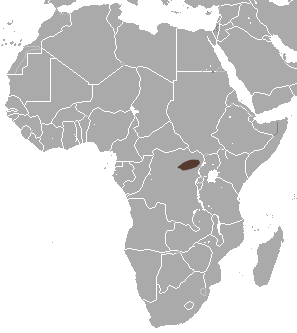
- Congo white-toothed shrew range

Species of mammal

The Congo white-toothed shrew (Crocidura congobelgica) is a species of mammal in the family Soricidae. It is found in the Democratic Republic of the Congo and Uganda. Its natural habitat is subtropical or tropical moist lowland forests.
