= Cameroonian shrew =

Conservation status
- Endangered (IUCN 3.1)

Scientific classification
- Kingdom: Animalia
- Phylum: Chordata
- Class: Mammalia
- Order: Eulipotyphla
- Family: Soricidae
- Genus: Crocidura
- Species: C. picea

Binomial name
- Crocidura picea Sanderson, 1940
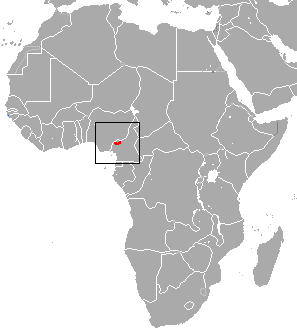
- Cameroonian shrew range

Species of mammal

The Cameroonian shrew (Crocidura picea) is a species of mammal in the family Soricidae. It is endemic to Cameroon. Its natural habitat is subtropical or tropical moist montane forests. It is threatened by habitat loss.
