= Upemba shrew =

Conservation status
- Data Deficient (IUCN 3.1)

Scientific classification
- Kingdom: Animalia
- Phylum: Chordata
- Class: Mammalia
- Order: Eulipotyphla
- Family: Soricidae
- Genus: Crocidura
- Species: C. zimmeri

Binomial name
- Crocidura zimmeri Osgood, 1936
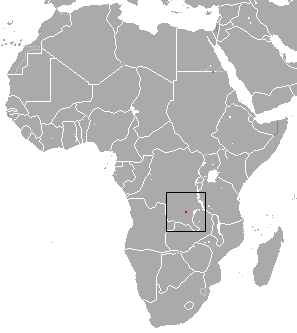
- Upemba shrew range

Species of mammal

The Upemba shrew (Crocidura zimmeri) is a species of shrew in the family Soricidae. It is endemic to Democratic Republic of the Congo. Its natural habitat is swamp.
