= Thalia's shrew =

Conservation status
- Least Concern (IUCN 3.1)

Scientific classification
- Kingdom: Animalia
- Phylum: Chordata
- Class: Mammalia
- Order: Eulipotyphla
- Family: Soricidae
- Genus: Crocidura
- Species: C. thalia

Binomial name
- Crocidura thalia Dippenaar, 1980
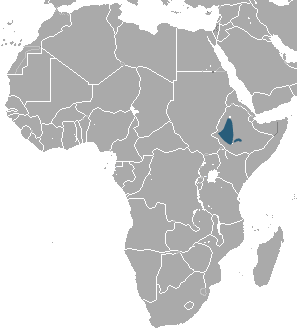
- Thalia's shrew range

Species of mammal

Thalia's shrew (Crocidura thalia) is a species of mammal in the family Soricidae. It is endemic to Ethiopia. The mammal's natural habitats are subtropical or tropical moist montane forests and high-elevation grasslands, and moist savanna.
