= Lesser Ryukyu shrew =

Conservation status
- Least Concern (IUCN 3.1)

Scientific classification
- Kingdom: Animalia
- Phylum: Chordata
- Class: Mammalia
- Order: Eulipotyphla
- Family: Soricidae
- Genus: Crocidura
- Species: C. watasei

Binomial name
- Crocidura watasei Kuroda, 1924
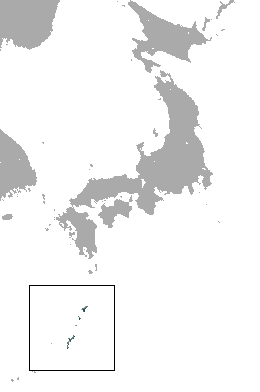
- Lesser Ryukyu shrew range

Species of mammal

The lesser Ryukyu shrew, or Watase's shrew (Crocidura watasei) is a common species of shrews that is endemic to Japan. It is often found living in bushes and grasslands along the river banks and in shrubs of lower elevations.
