= Yankari shrew =

Conservation status
- Least Concern (IUCN 3.1)

Scientific classification
- Kingdom: Animalia
- Phylum: Chordata
- Class: Mammalia
- Order: Eulipotyphla
- Family: Soricidae
- Genus: Crocidura
- Species: C. yankariensis

Binomial name
- Crocidura yankariensis Hutterer & Jenkins, 1980
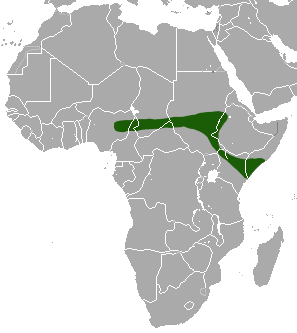
- Yankari shrew range

Species of mammal

The Yankari shrew (Crocidura yankariensis) is a species of mammal in the family Soricidae. It is found in Cameroon, Central African Republic, Chad, Ethiopia, Kenya, Nigeria, Somalia, and Sudan. Its natural habitat is dry savanna.
