= Iranian shrew =

Conservation status
- Data Deficient (IUCN 3.1)

Scientific classification
- Kingdom: Animalia
- Phylum: Chordata
- Class: Mammalia
- Order: Eulipotyphla
- Family: Soricidae
- Genus: Crocidura
- Species: C. susiana

Binomial name
- Crocidura susiana Redding & Lay, 1978
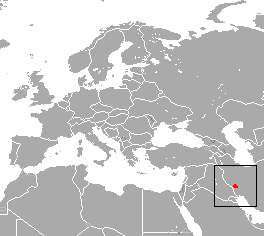
- Iranian shrew range

Species of mammal

The Iranian shrew (Crocidura susiana) is a species of mammal in the family Soricidae. It is endemic to Iran. It is threatened by habitat loss.
