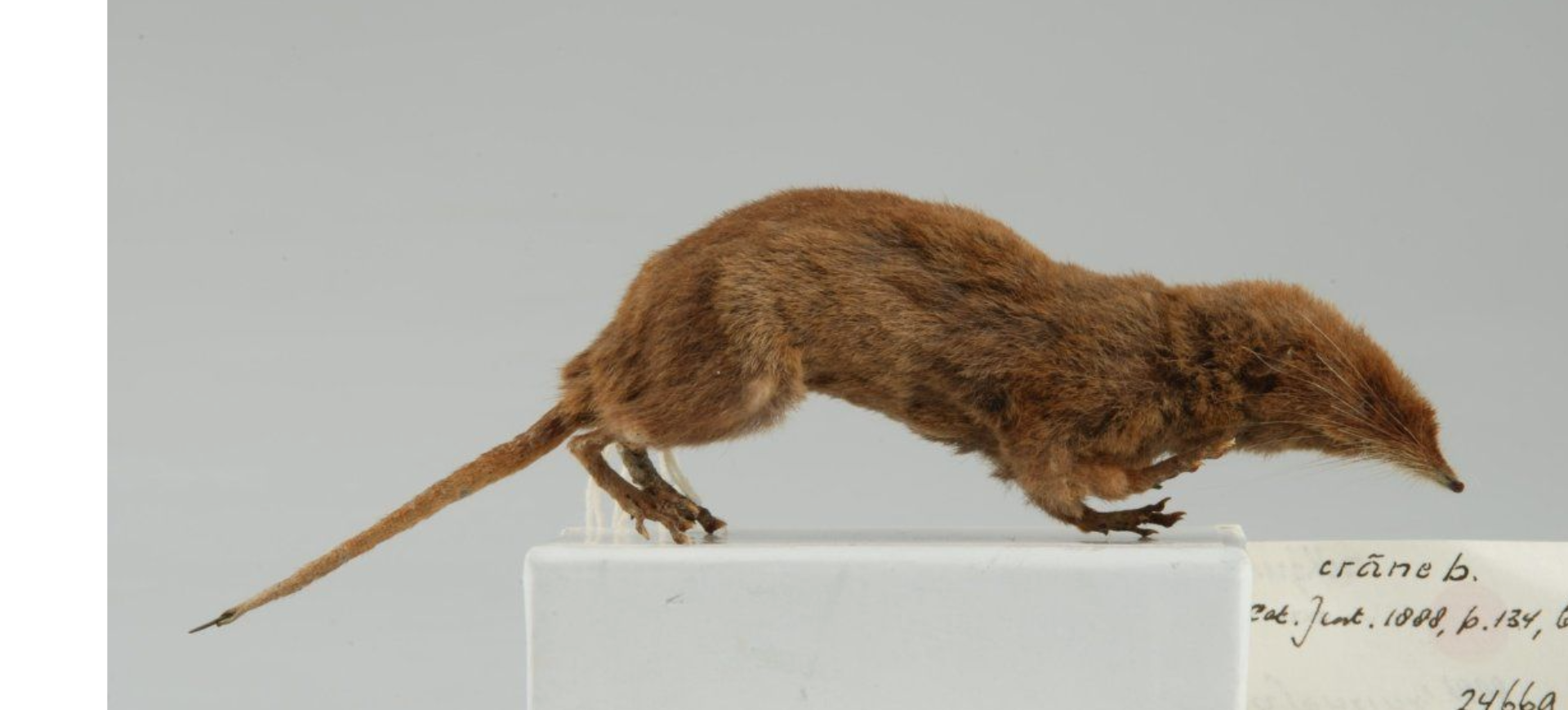

Conservation status
- Least Concern (IUCN 3.1)

Scientific classification
- Kingdom: Animalia
- Phylum: Chordata
- Class: Mammalia
- Order: Eulipotyphla
- Family: Soricidae
- Genus: Crocidura
- Species: C. hutanis

Binomial name
- Crocidura hutanis Ruedi & Vogel, 1995
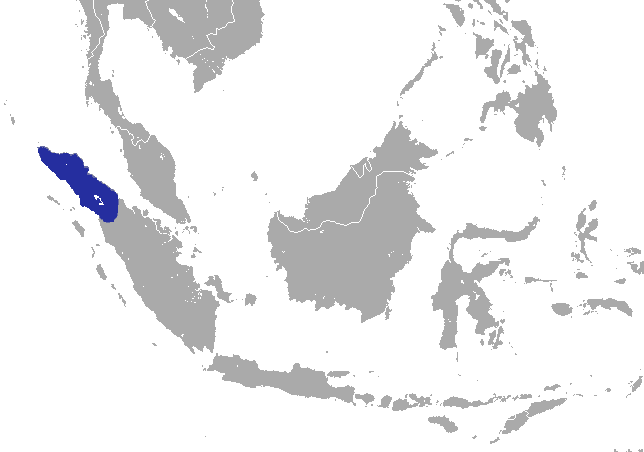
- Hutan shrew range

= Hutan shrew =

Species of mammal

The Hutan shrew (Crocidura hutanis) is a species of mammal in the family Soricidae. It is known only from northern Sumatra in Indonesia.
