= Flower's shrew =

Conservation status
- Data Deficient (IUCN 3.1)

Scientific classification
- Kingdom: Animalia
- Phylum: Chordata
- Class: Mammalia
- Order: Eulipotyphla
- Family: Soricidae
- Genus: Crocidura
- Species: C. floweri

Binomial name
- Crocidura floweri Dollman, 1915
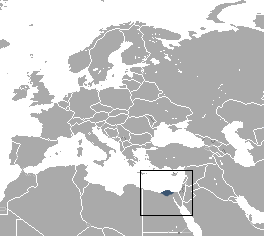
- Flower's shrew range

Species of mammal

Flower's shrew (Crocidura floweri) is a species of mammal in the family Soricidae. It is endemic to Egypt. Its natural habitat is arable land.
