= Batak shrew =

Conservation status
- Data Deficient (IUCN 3.1)

Scientific classification
- Kingdom: Animalia
- Phylum: Chordata
- Class: Mammalia
- Order: Eulipotyphla
- Family: Soricidae
- Genus: Crocidura
- Species: C. batakorum

Binomial name
- Crocidura batakorum Hutterer, 2007
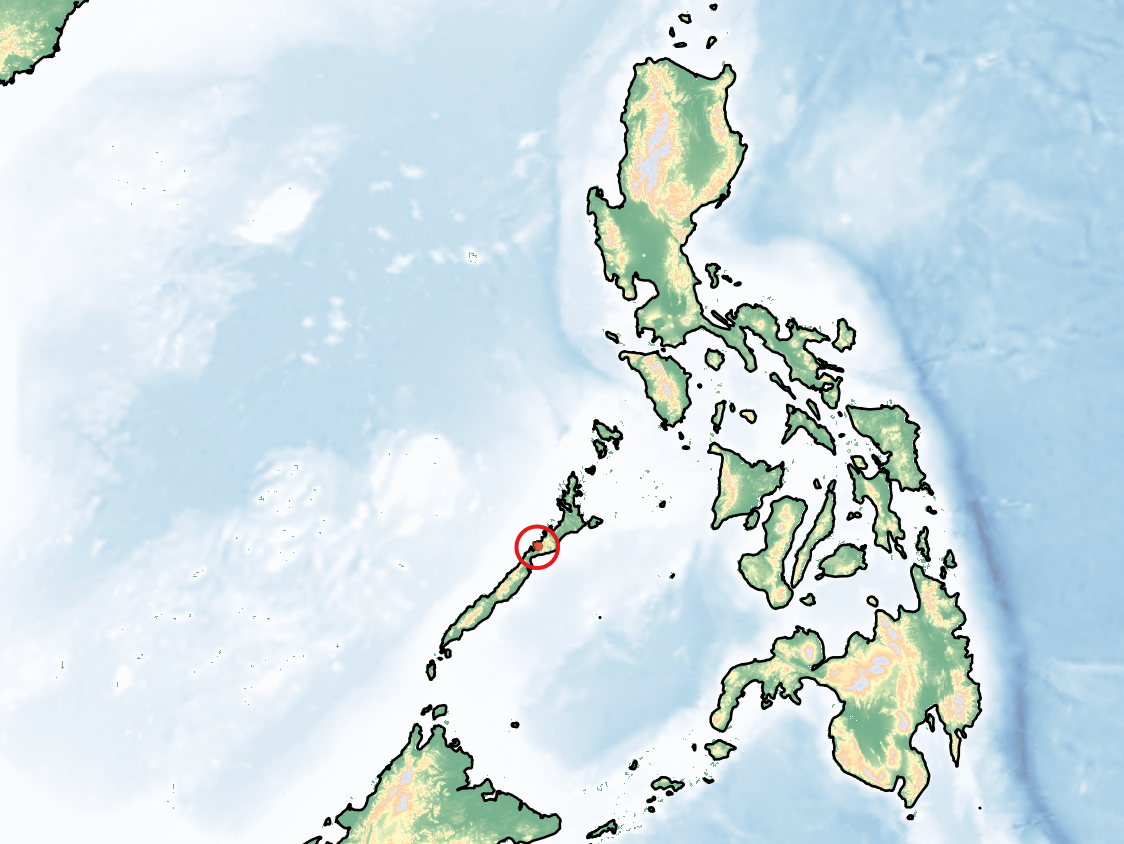

Species of mammal

The Batak shrew (Crocidura batakorum) is a species of shrew from the Philippines.

== Description ==
The Batak shrew is of small size, its head and body length of 63.5 millimetres (2.5 in), tail 43 mm (1.7 in), of which the proximal 22 mm (0.87 in) are sparsely covered by longer bristles, hindfoot 12.4 mm (0.49 in) with claw and 11.5 mm (0.45 in) without claw. The shrew's head is short and pointed, with sparse vibrissae up to 14 mm (0.55 in) in length. Its dorsal and ventral pelage is dark brown. Its hairs are 4.8 mm (0.19 in) on the dorsum and 4.3 mm (0.17 in) on the mid-venter in length. Its body hairs are uniformly coloured from base to tip.
