= MacMillan's shrew =

Conservation status
- Near Threatened (IUCN 3.1)

Scientific classification
- Kingdom: Animalia
- Phylum: Chordata
- Class: Mammalia
- Order: Eulipotyphla
- Family: Soricidae
- Genus: Crocidura
- Species: C. macmillani

Binomial name
- Crocidura macmillani Dollman, 1915
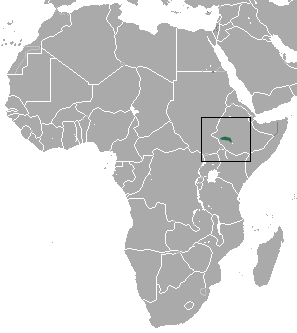
- MacMillan's shrew range

Species of mammal

MacMillan's shrew (Crocidura macmillani) is a species of mammal in the family Soricidae. It is endemic to the Ethiopian Highlands. Its natural habitats are subtropical or tropical moist montane forests, and moist savanna.
