= Pitman's shrew =

Conservation status
- Data Deficient (IUCN 3.1)

Scientific classification
- Kingdom: Animalia
- Phylum: Chordata
- Class: Mammalia
- Order: Eulipotyphla
- Family: Soricidae
- Genus: Crocidura
- Species: C. pitmani

Binomial name
- Crocidura pitmani Barclay, 1932
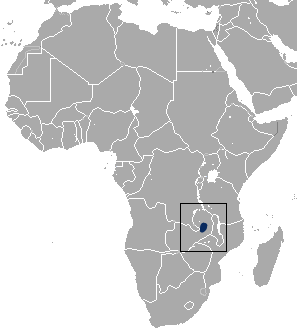
- Pitman's shrew range

Species of mammal

Pitman's shrew (Crocidura pitmani) is a species of mammal in the family Soricidae. It is endemic to Zambia.

== Sources ==
- Gerrie, R.; Kennerley, R. (2017) [errata version of 2016 assessment]. "Crocidura pitmani". IUCN Red List of Threatened Species. 2016 e.T5637A115079206. doi:10.2305/IUCN.UK.2016-3.RLTS.T5637A22301462.en.
