= Javan ghost shrew =

Scientific classification
- Kingdom: Animalia
- Phylum: Chordata
- Class: Mammalia
- Order: Eulipotyphla
- Family: Soricidae
- Genus: Crocidura
- Species: C. umbra

Binomial name
- Crocidura umbra Demos, Achmadi, Handika, Maharadatunkamsi, Rowe & Esselstyn, 2016

Species of mammal

The Javan ghost shrew (Crocidura umbra) is a species of mammal in the family Soricidae. It is endemic to Java where it is known only from Mount Gede and can be found from the type locality at 1,611 and 1,950 m elevation on Mt. Gede. Its natural habitat is tropical montane rainforest. It has a restricted range and is threatened by habitat loss. It was first described as a new species to science in 2016 and the authors recommended the name 'Javan ghost shrew' as its English common name."Relative to other Javan shrews, the new species is small with a relatively thick, dark brown, medium-length tail".
