= Ugandan lowland shrew =

Conservation status
- Data Deficient (IUCN 3.1)

Scientific classification
- Kingdom: Animalia
- Phylum: Chordata
- Class: Mammalia
- Order: Eulipotyphla
- Family: Soricidae
- Genus: Crocidura
- Species: C. selina

Binomial name
- Crocidura selina (Dollman, 1915)
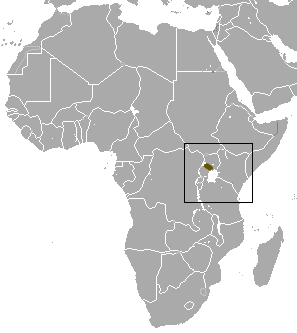
- Ugandan lowland shrew range

Species of mammal

The Ugandan lowland shrew or Moon shrew, (Crocidura selina) is a species of mammal in the family Soricidae. It is found in Kenya and Uganda. Its natural habitats are subtropical or tropical swamps and montane forests.
