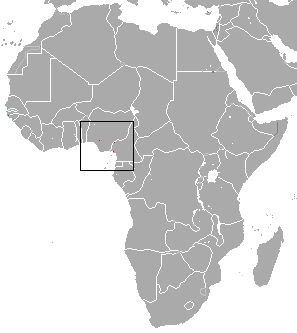
- Mamfe Shrew area

Conservation status
- Least Concern (IUCN 3.1)

Scientific classification
- Kingdom: Animalia
- Phylum: Chordata
- Class: Mammalia
- Order: Eulipotyphla
- Family: Soricidae
- Genus: Crocidura
- Species: C. virgata

Binomial name
- Crocidura virgata Sanderson, 1940

= Mamfe shrew =

Species of mammal

The Mamfe shrew (Crocidura virgata) is a species of mammal in the family Soricidae. It was discovered in 1940, and can be found in Nigeria and Cameroon.
