= Crocidura guy =

Conservation status
- Data Deficient (IUCN 3.1)

Scientific classification
- Kingdom: Animalia
- Phylum: Chordata
- Class: Mammalia
- Order: Eulipotyphla
- Family: Soricidae
- Genus: Crocidura
- Species: C. guy

Binomial name
- Crocidura guy Jenkins, Lunde & Moncrieff, 2009

Species of mammal

Crocidura guy is of species of shrew from Northeastern Vietnam, Viet Bac karst formation.
