= African black shrew =

Conservation status
- Least Concern (IUCN 3.1)

Scientific classification
- Kingdom: Animalia
- Phylum: Chordata
- Class: Mammalia
- Order: Eulipotyphla
- Family: Soricidae
- Genus: Crocidura
- Species: C. nigrofusca

Binomial name
- Crocidura nigrofusca Matschie, 1895
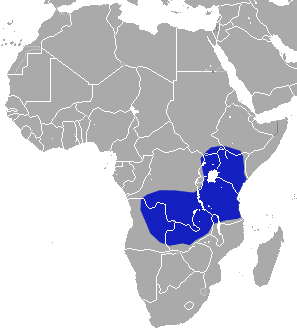
- African black shrew range

Species of mammal

The African black shrew (Crocidura nigrofusca) is a species of shrew. It is native to Africa, where it is widespread. Other common names include tenebrous shrew. This shrew can be found in several types of lower-elevation moist tropical forest habitat.
