= Panay shrew =

Conservation status
- Data Deficient (IUCN 3.1)

Scientific classification
- Kingdom: Animalia
- Phylum: Chordata
- Class: Mammalia
- Order: Eulipotyphla
- Family: Soricidae
- Genus: Crocidura
- Species: C. panayensis

Binomial name
- Crocidura panayensis Hutterer, 2007
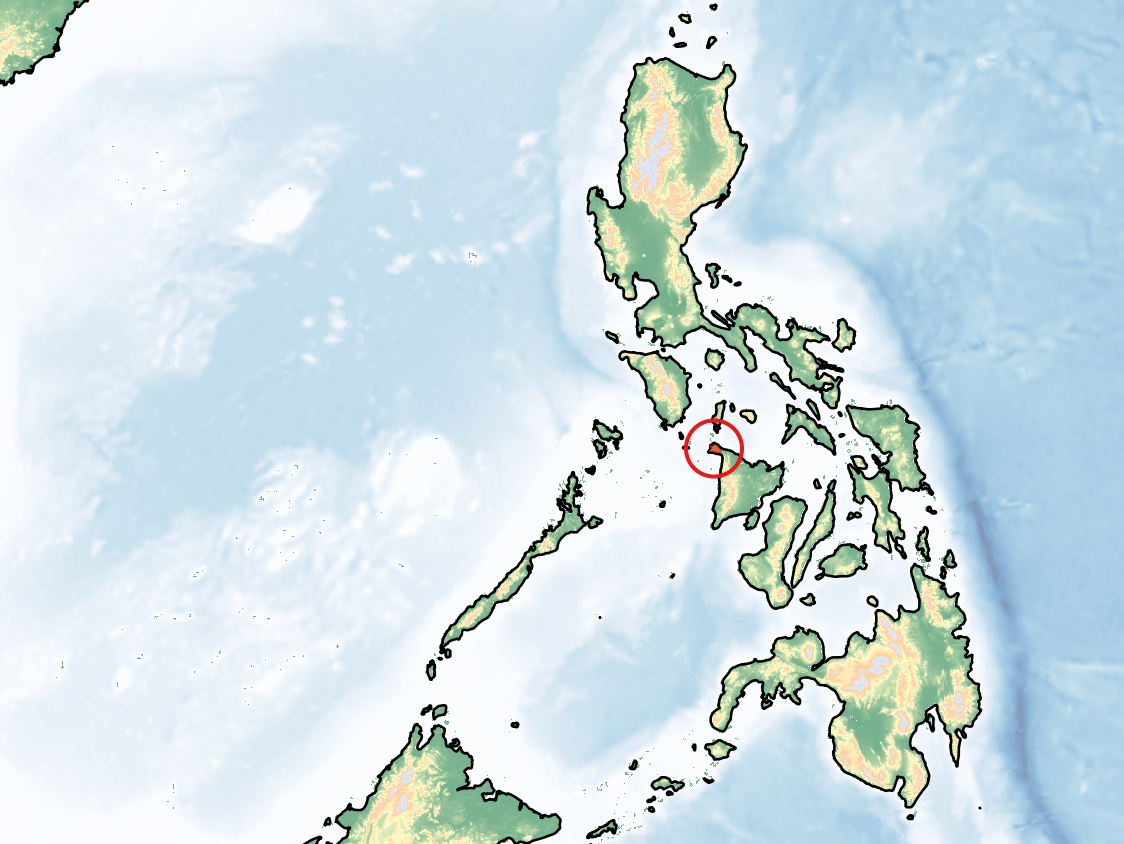

Species of mammal

The Panay shrew (Crocidura panayensis) is a species of shrew from the Philippines.

== Description ==
It is of medium size, with a head and body length of 65–74 millimetres (2.6–2.9 in), with a long tail 81–94% of the head and body length. Its head is long and pointed, with numerous long vibrissae up to 22 mm (0.87 in) in length.

Its dorsal pelage is blackish brown, gradually fading into dusky brown on venter. Its body hairs are fairly uniformly coloured from base to tip. The tail is as dusky-coloured as the body, with the ventral surface being only slightly paler.

Long bristle hairs are present on the proximal half of the tail. The dorsal and part of the ventral surfaces of the fore and hind feet are covered by dark short hairs, with the lateral surfaces slightly darker brown than the inner surfaces. Female have two pairs of inguinal nipples.
