= Caspian shrew =

Conservation status
- Data Deficient (IUCN 3.1)

Scientific classification
- Kingdom: Animalia
- Phylum: Chordata
- Class: Mammalia
- Order: Eulipotyphla
- Family: Soricidae
- Genus: Crocidura
- Species: C. caspica

Binomial name
- Crocidura caspica Thomas, 1907
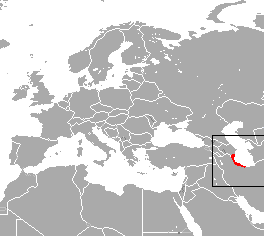
- Caspian shrew range

Species of mammal

The Caspian shrew (Crocidura caspica) is a species of mammal in the family Soricidae. It is found along the southern coast of the Caspian Sea in Iran and Azerbaijan.
