= Kivu shrew =

Conservation status
- Near Threatened (IUCN 3.1)

Scientific classification
- Kingdom: Animalia
- Phylum: Chordata
- Class: Mammalia
- Order: Eulipotyphla
- Family: Soricidae
- Genus: Crocidura
- Species: C. kivuana

Binomial name
- Crocidura kivuana Heim de Balsac, 1968
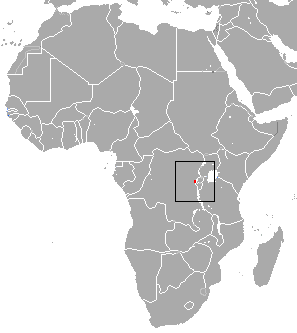
- Kivu shrew range

Species of mammal

The Kivu shrew (Crocidura kivuana) is a species of mammal in the family Soricidae. It is endemic to Democratic Republic of the Congo. Its natural habitat is swamp.
