= Katinka's shrew =

Conservation status
- Data Deficient (IUCN 3.1)

Scientific classification
- Kingdom: Animalia
- Phylum: Chordata
- Class: Mammalia
- Infraclass: Placentalia
- Order: Eulipotyphla
- Family: Soricidae
- Genus: Crocidura
- Species: C. katinka

Binomial name
- Crocidura katinka Bate, 1937
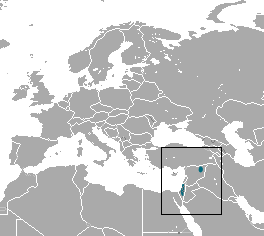
- Katinka's shrew range

Species of mammal

Katinka's shrew (Crocidura katinka) is a species of mammal in the family Soricidae. It has been recorded from Israel, Syria, and Palestine, but it may now be extinct in Israel. It may also be present in southwestern Iran.
