= Lesser rock shrew =

Conservation status
- Least Concern (IUCN 3.1)

Scientific classification
- Kingdom: Animalia
- Phylum: Chordata
- Class: Mammalia
- Order: Eulipotyphla
- Family: Soricidae
- Genus: Crocidura
- Species: C. serezkyensis

Binomial name
- Crocidura serezkyensis Laptev, 1929
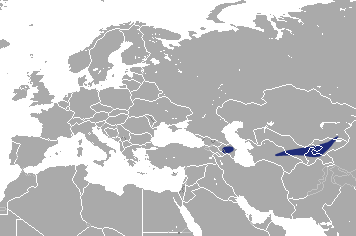
- Lesser rock shrew range

Species of mammal

The lesser rock shrew (Crocidura serezkyensis) is a species of mammal in the family Soricidae. It is found in Azerbaijan, Kazakhstan, Tajikistan, and Turkey.
