= Lesser dwarf shrew =

Conservation status
- Least Concern (IUCN 3.1)

Scientific classification
- Kingdom: Animalia
- Phylum: Chordata
- Class: Mammalia
- Order: Eulipotyphla
- Family: Soricidae
- Genus: Suncus
- Species: S. varilla

Binomial name
- Suncus varilla (Thomas, 1895)
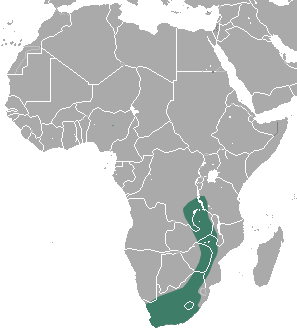
- Lesser dwarf shrew range

Species of mammal

The lesser dwarf shrew (Suncus varilla) is a species of mammal in the genus Soricidae. It is found in Botswana, Democratic Republic of the Congo, Lesotho, Malawi, Mozambique, South Africa, Tanzania, Zambia, and Zimbabwe. It has a total length of only 9cm, making it one of the smallest shrews. Most of its fur is grey and its lower body is off-white. Not much is known about its behavior and habitat, since it is hard to capture. It's often found in and near termite mounds, where it nests in and probably also forages. It feeds on insects.
