= Jouvenet's shrew =

Conservation status
- Least Concern (IUCN 3.1)

Scientific classification
- Kingdom: Animalia
- Phylum: Chordata
- Class: Mammalia
- Order: Eulipotyphla
- Family: Soricidae
- Genus: Crocidura
- Species: C. jouvenetae

Binomial name
- Crocidura jouvenetae Heim de Balsac, 1958
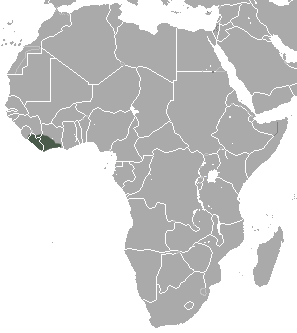

Synonyms
- Crocidura ebriensis Heim de Balsac & Aellen, 1958

Species of mammal

Jouvenet's shrew (Crocidura jouvenetae) is a species of mammal in the family Soricidae. It is found in Côte d'Ivoire, Guinea, Liberia, and Sierra Leone. This species is present in lowland tropical moist forest and possibly in montane forest.

It was first described by Henri Heim de Balsac who named it after Mademmoiselle A. Jouvenet.
