= Palawan shrew =

Conservation status
- Least Concern (IUCN 3.1)

Scientific classification
- Kingdom: Animalia
- Phylum: Chordata
- Class: Mammalia
- Order: Eulipotyphla
- Family: Soricidae
- Genus: Crocidura
- Species: C. palawanensis

Binomial name
- Crocidura palawanensis Taylor, 1934
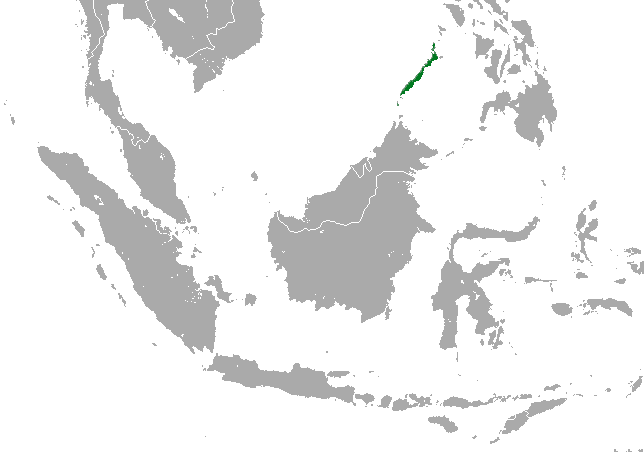
- Palawan shrew range

Species of mammal

The Palawan shrew (Crocidura palawanensis) is a species of mammal in the family Soricidae. It is endemic to the Philippines and known from Palawan and Balabac Islands, from sea level to 1,300 m (4,300 ft) asl. It occurs in old growth and scrubby secondary forest.
