= Somali shrew =

Conservation status
- Least Concern (IUCN 3.1)

Scientific classification
- Kingdom: Animalia
- Phylum: Chordata
- Class: Mammalia
- Order: Eulipotyphla
- Family: Soricidae
- Genus: Crocidura
- Species: C. somalica

Binomial name
- Crocidura somalica Thomas, 1895
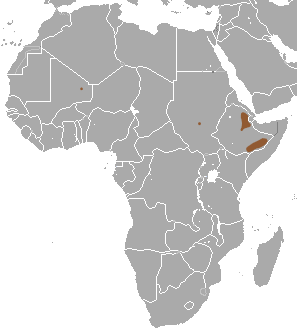
- Somali shrew range

Species of mammal

The Somali shrew (Crocidura somalica) is a species of mammal in the family Soricidae. It is found in Ethiopia, Mali, Somalia, and Sudan. Its natural habitat is dry savanna.
