= Kashmir white-toothed shrew =

Conservation status
- Data Deficient (IUCN 3.1)

Scientific classification
- Kingdom: Animalia
- Phylum: Chordata
- Class: Mammalia
- Order: Eulipotyphla
- Family: Soricidae
- Genus: Crocidura
- Species: C. pullata

Binomial name
- Crocidura pullata Miller, 1911
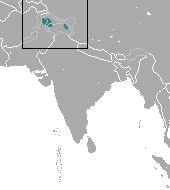
- Kashmir white-toothed shrew range

Species of mammal

The Kashmir white-toothed shrew (Crocidura pullata) is a species of mammal in the family Soricidae. It is found in India and Pakistan.
