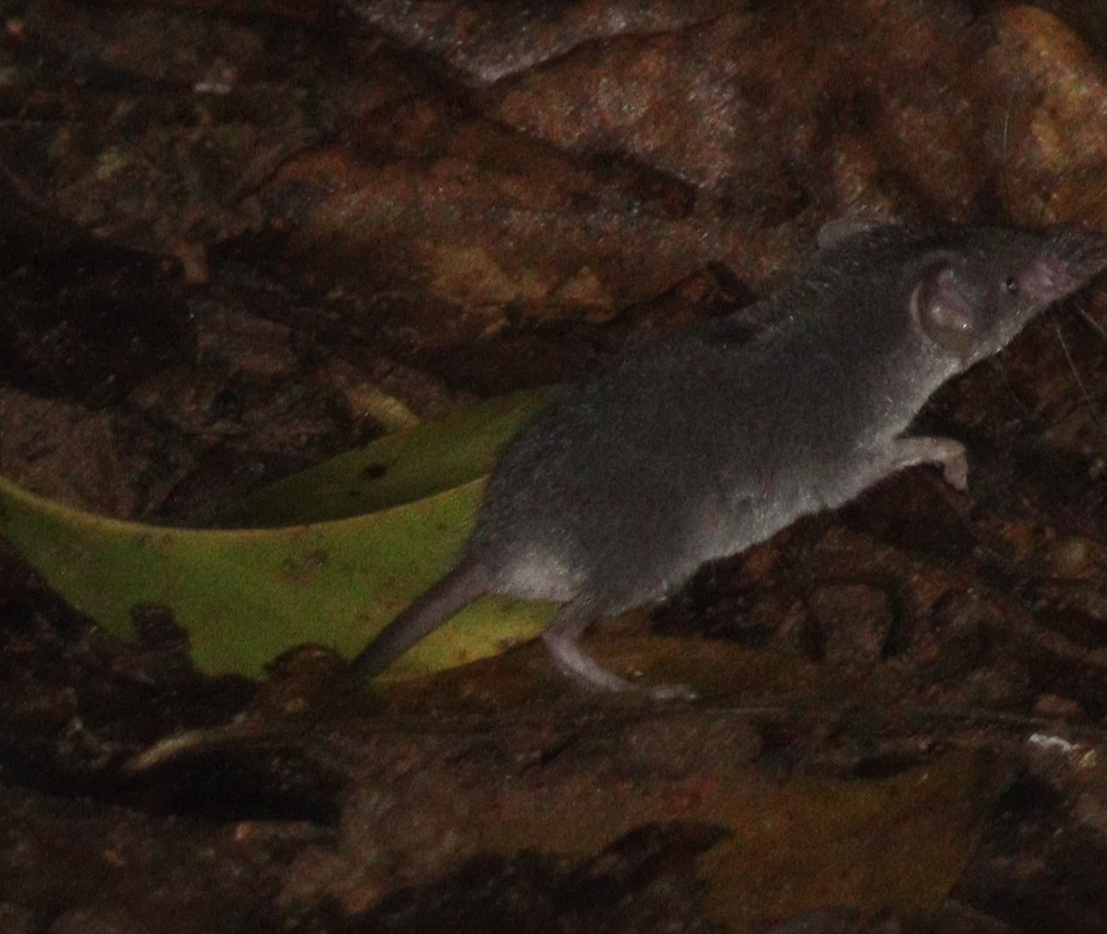

Conservation status
- Least Concern (IUCN 3.1)

Scientific classification
- Kingdom: Animalia
- Phylum: Chordata
- Class: Mammalia
- Order: Eulipotyphla
- Family: Soricidae
- Genus: Crocidura
- Species: C. fuliginosa

Binomial name
- Crocidura fuliginosa (Blyth, 1856)
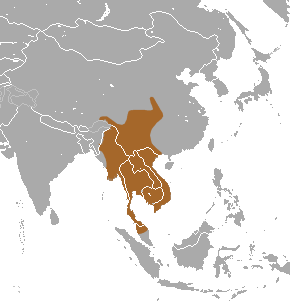
- Southeast Asian Shrew range

= Southeast Asian shrew =

Species of mammal

The Southeast Asian shrew (Crocidura fuliginosa) is a shrew that was, along with Hildegarde's shrew, described in 1904.

== Distribution and habitat ==
The Southeast Asian shrew is found in Cambodia, India, China, Laos, Malaysia, Myanmar, Thailand, and Vietnam.
