= Shaggy rat =

Shaggy rat may refer to:

- Crawford-Cabral's shaggy rat or Crawford-Cabral's shaggy marsh rat (Dasymys cabrali), species of shaggy marsh rat endemic to north-eastern Namibia
- Fox's shaggy rat (Dasymys foxi), species of rodent in the family Muridae. It is found only in Nigeria
- Glover Allen's Shaggy rat, or Glover Allen's shaggy rat (Dasymys alleni), a species of shaggy marsh rat indigenous to Mount Rungwe in south-western Tanzania
- Montane shaggy rat (Dasymys montanus), species of rodent in the family Muridae. It is found in Uganda and possibly Democratic Republic of the Congo
- Robert's shaggy rat (Dasymys robertsii), species of rodent in the genus Dasymys that lives in South Africa
- Rwandan shaggy rat (Dasymys rwandae), species of shaggy marsh rat endemic to north-western Rwanda
- Tanzanian shaggy rat (Dasymys sua), species of shaggy marsh rat endemic to eastern Tanzania
- West African shaggy rat (Dasymys rufulus), species of rodent in the family Muridae

== See also ==
- Dasymys
