= List of mammals of Tanzania =

This is a list of the mammal species recorded in Tanzania. Of the mammal species in Tanzania, 2 are critically endangered, 13 are endangered, 19 are vulnerable, and 17 are near threatened.

The following tags are used to highlight each species' conservation status as assessed by the International Union for Conservation of Nature:

EX	Extinct	No reasonable doubt that the last individual has died.
EW	Extinct in the wild	Known only to survive in captivity or as a naturalized population well outside its historic range.
CR	Critically endangered	The species is facing an extremely high risk of extinction in the wild.
EN	Endangered	The species is facing a very high risk of extinction in the wild.
VU	Vulnerable	The species is facing a high risk of extinction in the wild.
NT	Near threatened	The species does not currently qualify as being at high risk of extinction but it is likely to do so in the future.
LC	Least concern	The species is not currently at risk of extinction in the wild.
DD	Data deficient	There is inadequate information to assess the risk of extinction for this species.

Some species were assessed using an earlier set of criteria. Species assessed using this system have the following instead of near threatened and least concern categories:

LR/cd	Lower risk/conservation dependent	Species which were the focus of conservation programmes and may have moved into a higher risk category if that programme was discontinued.
LR/nt	Lower risk/near threatened	Species which are close to being classified as vulnerable but are not the subject of conservation programmes.
LR/lc	Lower risk/least concern	Species for which there are no identifiable risks.

== Order: Afrosoricida (tenrecs and golden moles) ==
The order Afrosoricida contains the golden moles of southern Africa and the tenrecs of Madagascar and Africa, two families of small mammals that were traditionally part of the order Insectivora.

- Family: Tenrecidae (tenrecs)
  - Subfamily: Potamogalinae
    - Genus: Potamogale
      - Giant otter shrew, P. velox LC
- Family: Chrysochloridae
  - Subfamily: Chrysochlorinae
    - Genus: Chrysochloris
      - Stuhlmann's golden mole, C. stuhlmanni LC

== Order: Macroscelidea (elephant shrews) ==
Often called sengis, the elephant shrews or jumping shrews are native to southern Africa. Their common English name derives from their elongated flexible snout and their resemblance to the true shrews.

- Family: Macroscelididae (elephant-shrews)
  - Genus: Elephantulus
    - Short-snouted elephant shrew, Elephantulus brachyrhynchus LC
    - Rufous elephant shrew, Elephantulus rufescens LC
  - Genus: Petrodromus
    - Four-toed elephant shrew, Petrodromus tetradactylus LC
  - Genus: Rhynchocyon
    - Checkered elephant shrew, R. cirnei LC
    - Black and rufous elephant shrew, R. petersi LC
    - Grey-faced elephant shrew, R. udzungwensis VU

== Order: Tubulidentata (aardvarks) ==
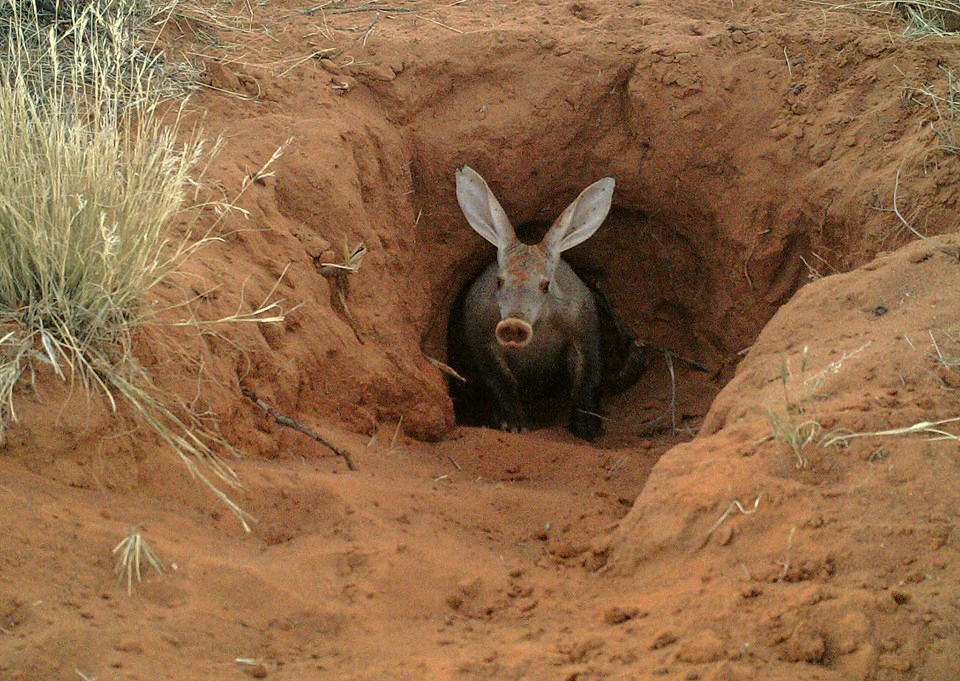
Aardvark

The order Tubulidentata consists of a single species, the aardvark. Tubulidentata are characterised by their teeth which lack a pulp cavity and form thin tubes which are continuously worn down and replaced.

- Family: Orycteropodidae
  - Genus: Orycteropus
    - Aardvark, O. afer LC

== Order: Hyracoidea (hyraxes) ==
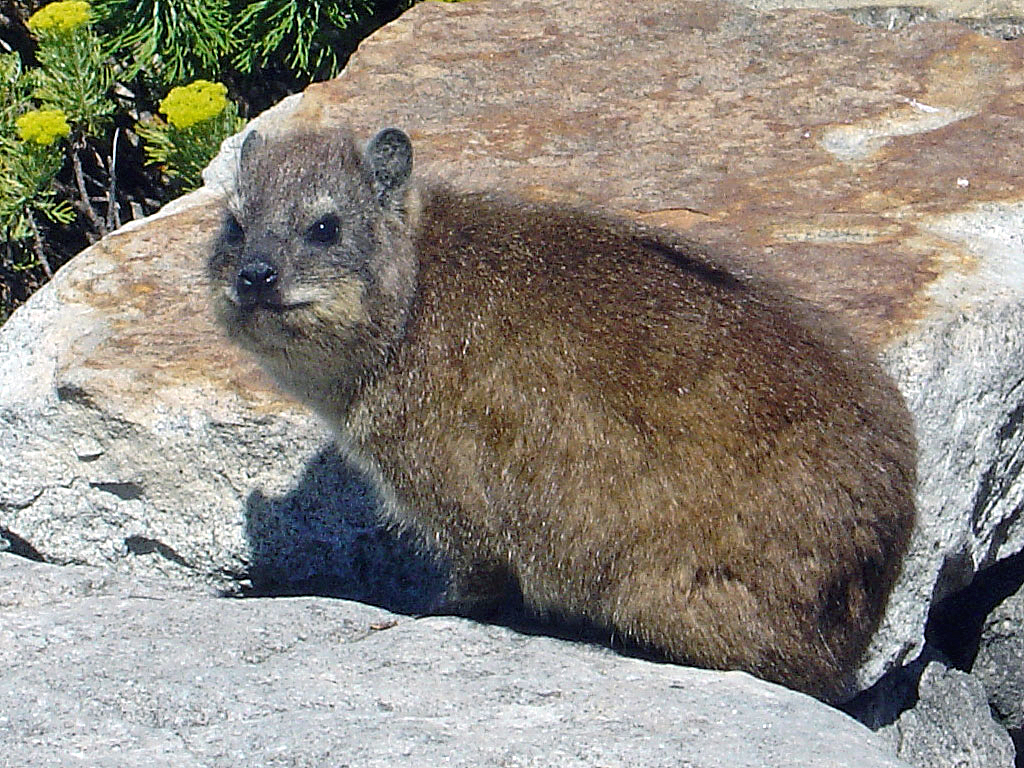
Cape hyrax

The hyraxes are any of four species of fairly small, thickset, herbivorous mammals in the order Hyracoidea. About the size of a domestic cat they are well-furred, with rounded bodies and a stumpy tail. They are native to Africa and the Middle East.

- Family: Procaviidae (hyraxes)
  - Genus: Dendrohyrax
    - Southern tree hyrax, Dendrohyrax arboreus LC
    - Western tree hyrax, Dendrohyrax dorsalis LC
    - Eastern tree hyrax, Dendrohyrax validus NT
  - Genus: Heterohyrax
    - Yellow-spotted rock hyrax, Heterohyrax brucei LC
  - Genus: Procavia
    - Cape hyrax, Procavia capensis LC

== Order: Proboscidea (elephants) ==
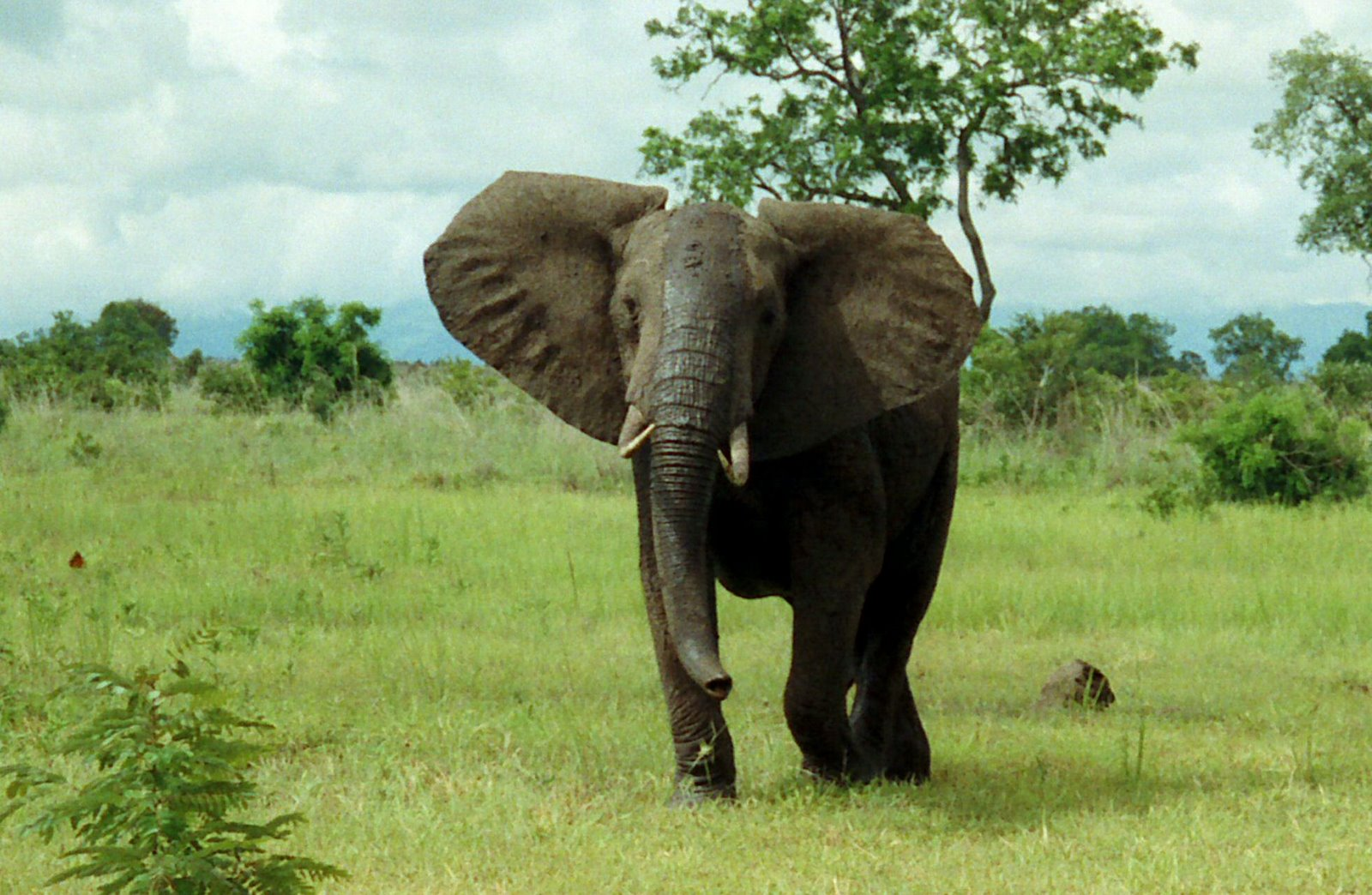
African bush elephant

The elephants comprise three living species and are the largest living land animals.

- Family: Elephantidae (elephants)
  - Genus: Loxodonta
    - African bush elephant, L. africana EN

== Order: Sirenia (manatees and dugongs) ==
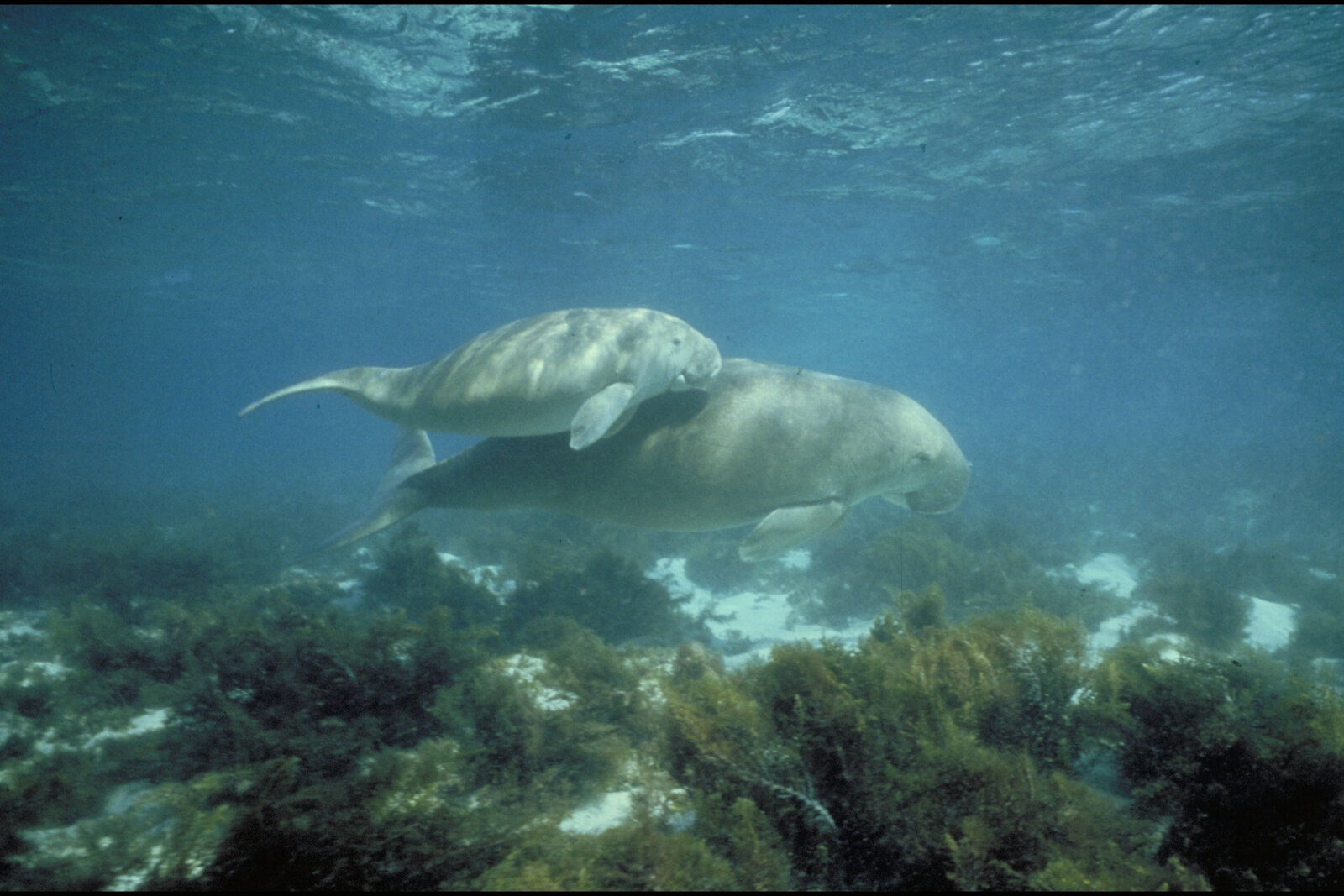
Dugongs

Sirenia is an order of fully aquatic, herbivorous mammals that inhabit rivers, estuaries, coastal marine waters, swamps, and marine wetlands. All four species are endangered.

- Family: Dugongidae
  - Genus: Dugong
    - Dugong, D. dugon VU

== Order: Primates ==
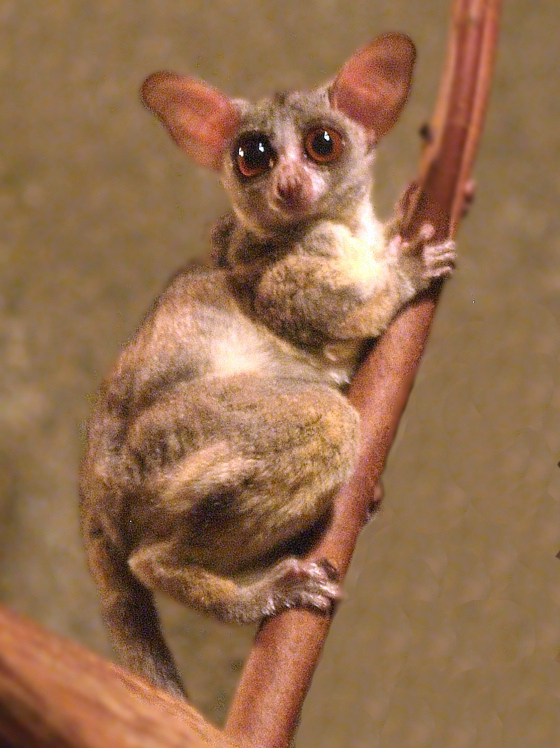
Senegal bushbaby

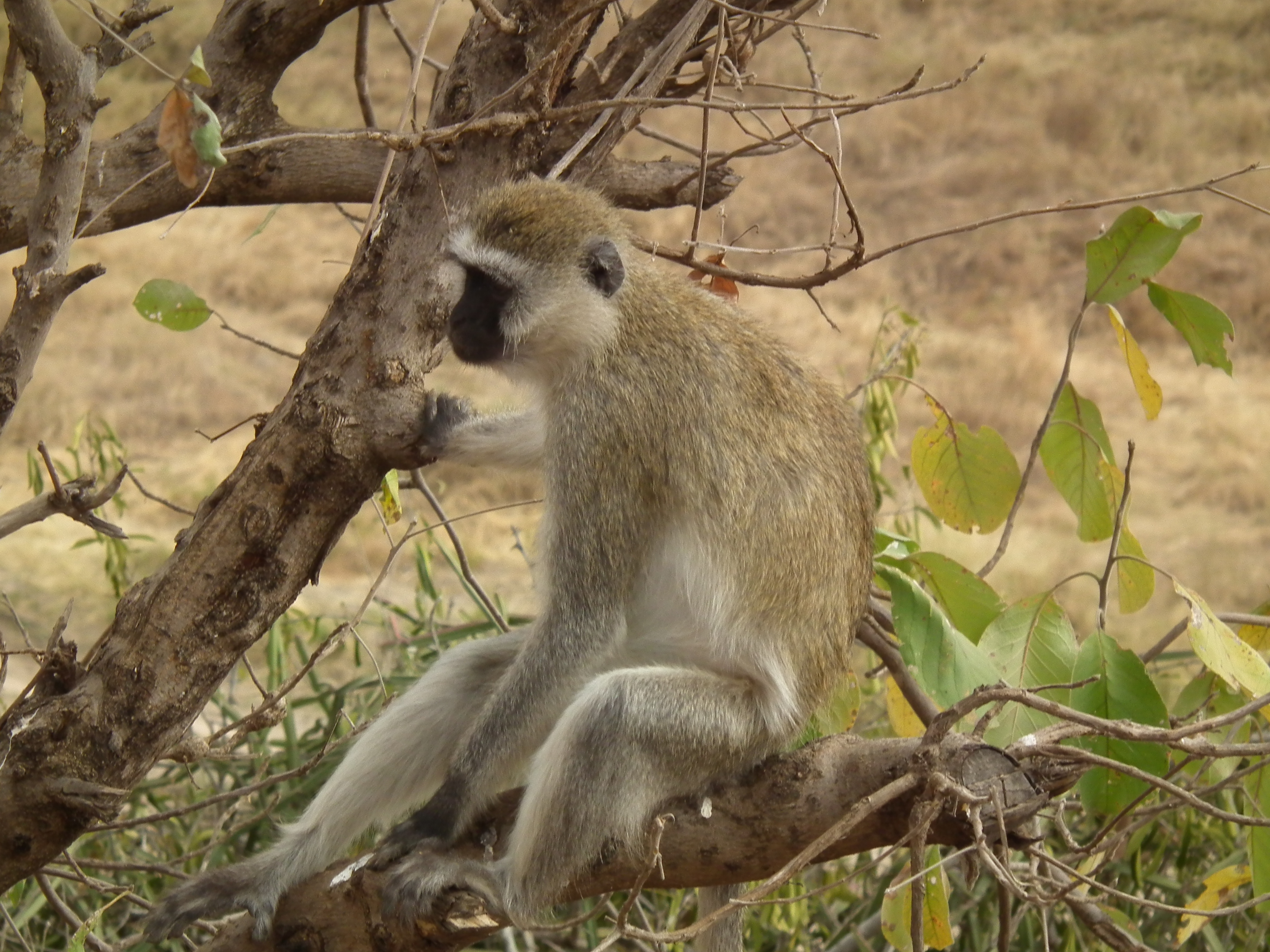
Vervet monkey

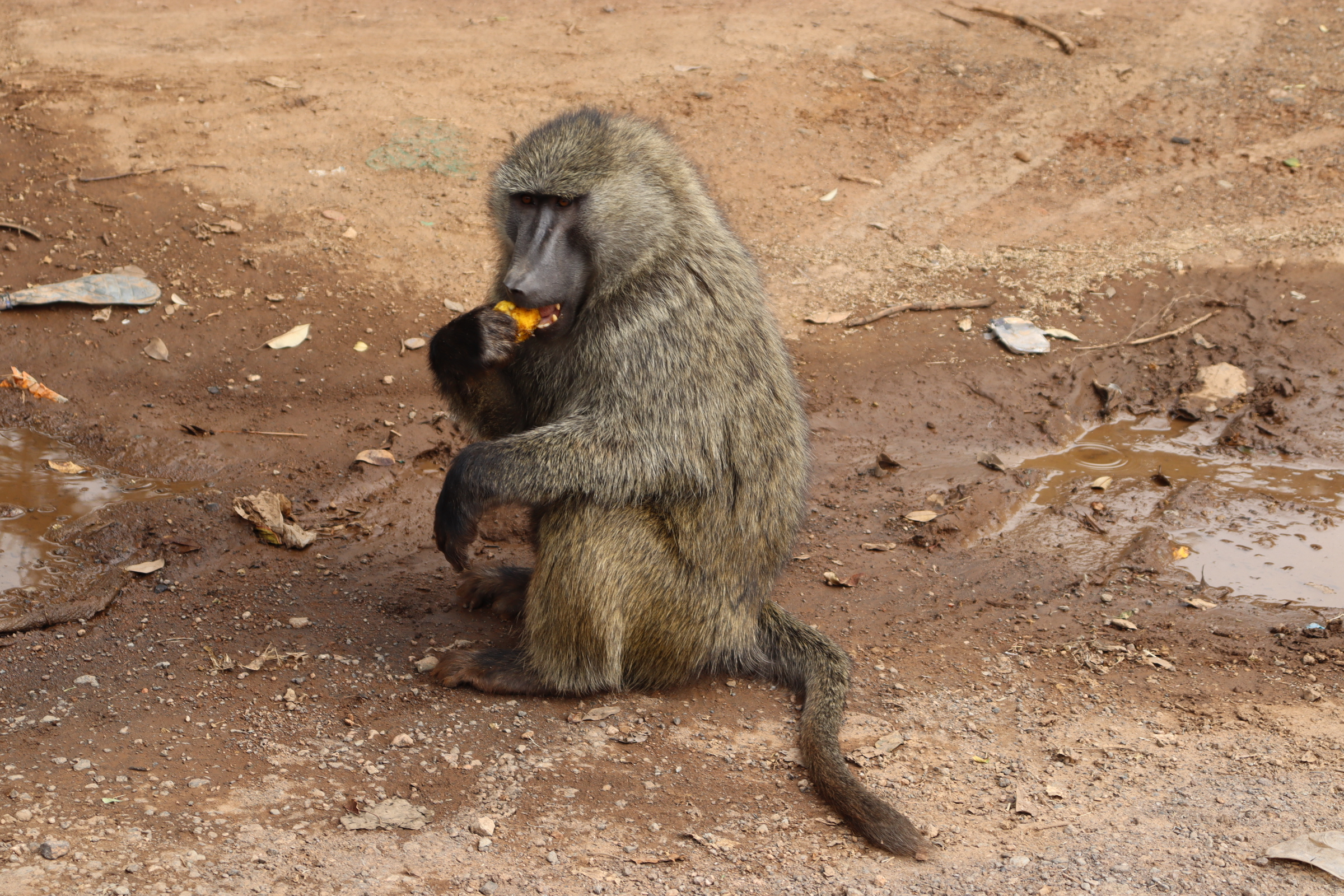
Olive baboon

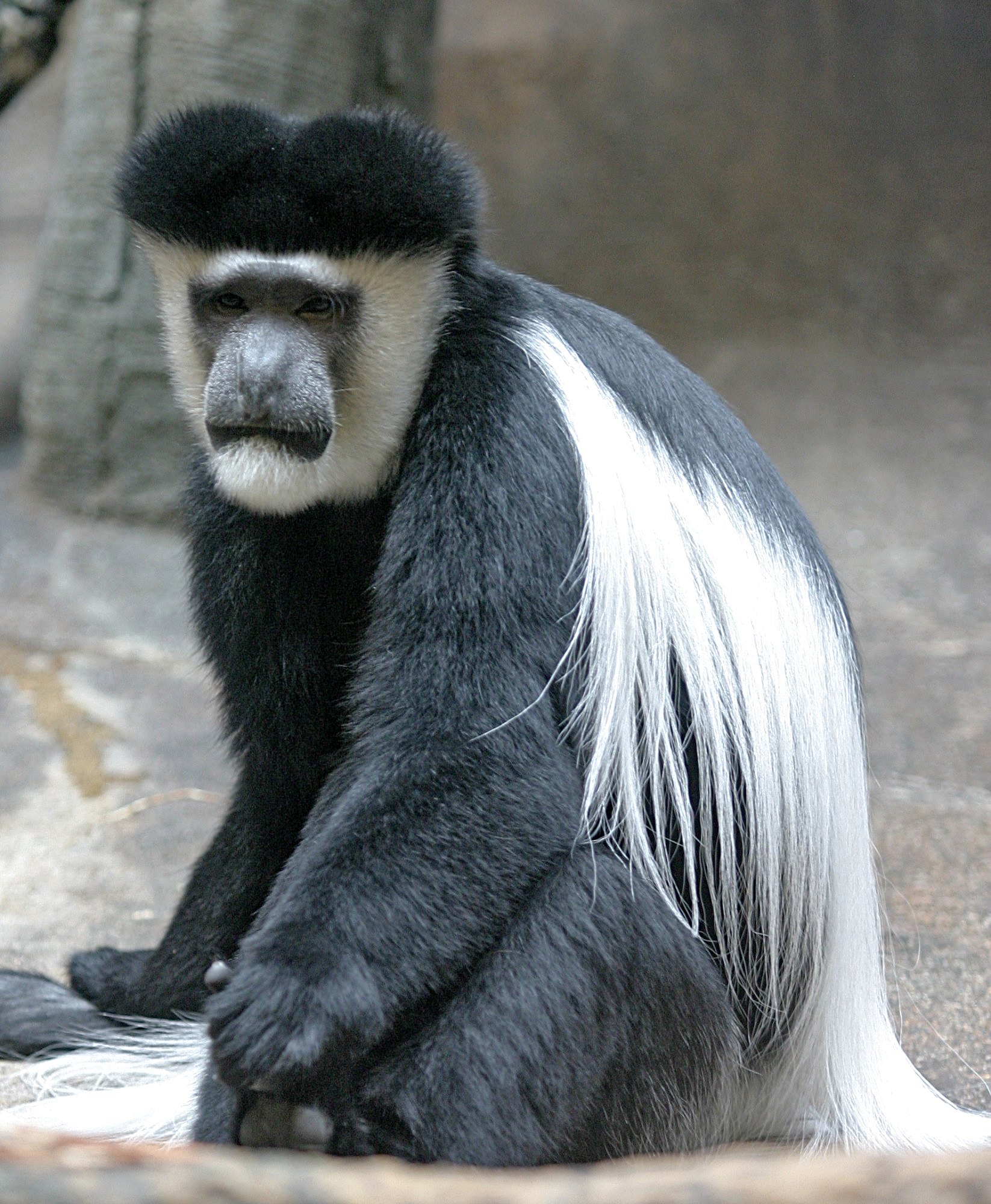
Mantled guereza

The order Primates contains humans and their closest relatives: lemurs, lorisoids, tarsiers, monkeys, and apes.

- Suborder: Strepsirrhini
  - Infraorder: Lemuriformes
    - Superfamily: Lorisoidea
      - Family: Galagidae
        - Genus: Galagoides
          - Grant's bushbaby, Galagoides granti DD
          - Uluguru bushbaby, Galagoides orinus DD
          - Rondo dwarf galago, Galagoides rondoensis EN
          - Thomas's bushbaby, Galagoides thomasi LR/lc
          - Zanzibar bushbaby, Galagoides zanzibaricus LR/nt
          - Prince Demidoff's bushbaby, Galagoides demidovii LR/lc
        - Genus: Galago
          - Mohol bushbaby, Galago moholi LR/lc
          - Senegal bushbaby, Galago senegalensis LR/lc
        - Genus: Otolemur
          - Brown greater galago, Otolemur crassicaudatus LR/lc
          - Northern greater galago, Otolemur garnettii LR/lc
- Suborder: Haplorhini
  - Infraorder: Simiiformes
    - Parvorder: Catarrhini
      - Superfamily: Cercopithecoidea
        - Family: Cercopithecidae (Old World monkeys)
          - Genus: Erythrocebus
            - Patas monkey, Erythrocebus patas LR/lc
          - Genus: Chlorocebus
            - Vervet monkey, Chlorocebus pygerythrus LR/lc
          - Genus: Cercopithecus
            - Red-tailed monkey, Cercopithecus ascanius LR/lc
            - Blue monkey, Cercopithecus mitis LR/lc
          - Genus: Lophocebus
            - Grey-cheeked mangabey, Lophocebus albigena LR/lc
          - Genus: Papio
            - Olive baboon, Papio anubis LR/lc
            - Yellow baboon, Papio cynocephalus LR/lc
          - Genus: Cercocebus
            - Crested mangabey, Cercocebus galeritus LR/nt
          - Subfamily: Colobinae
            - Genus: Colobus
              - Angola colobus, Colobus angolensis LR/lc
              - Mantled guereza, Colobus guereza LR/lc
            - Genus: Procolobus
              - Udzungwa red colobus, Procolobus gordonorum VU
              - Zanzibar red colobus, Procolobus kirkii EN
      - Superfamily: Hominoidea
        - Family: Hominidae
          - Subfamily: Homininae
            - Tribe: Panini
              - Genus: Pan
                - Common chimpanzee, P. troglodytes EN
                  - Eastern chimpanzee, P. t. schweinfurthii EN

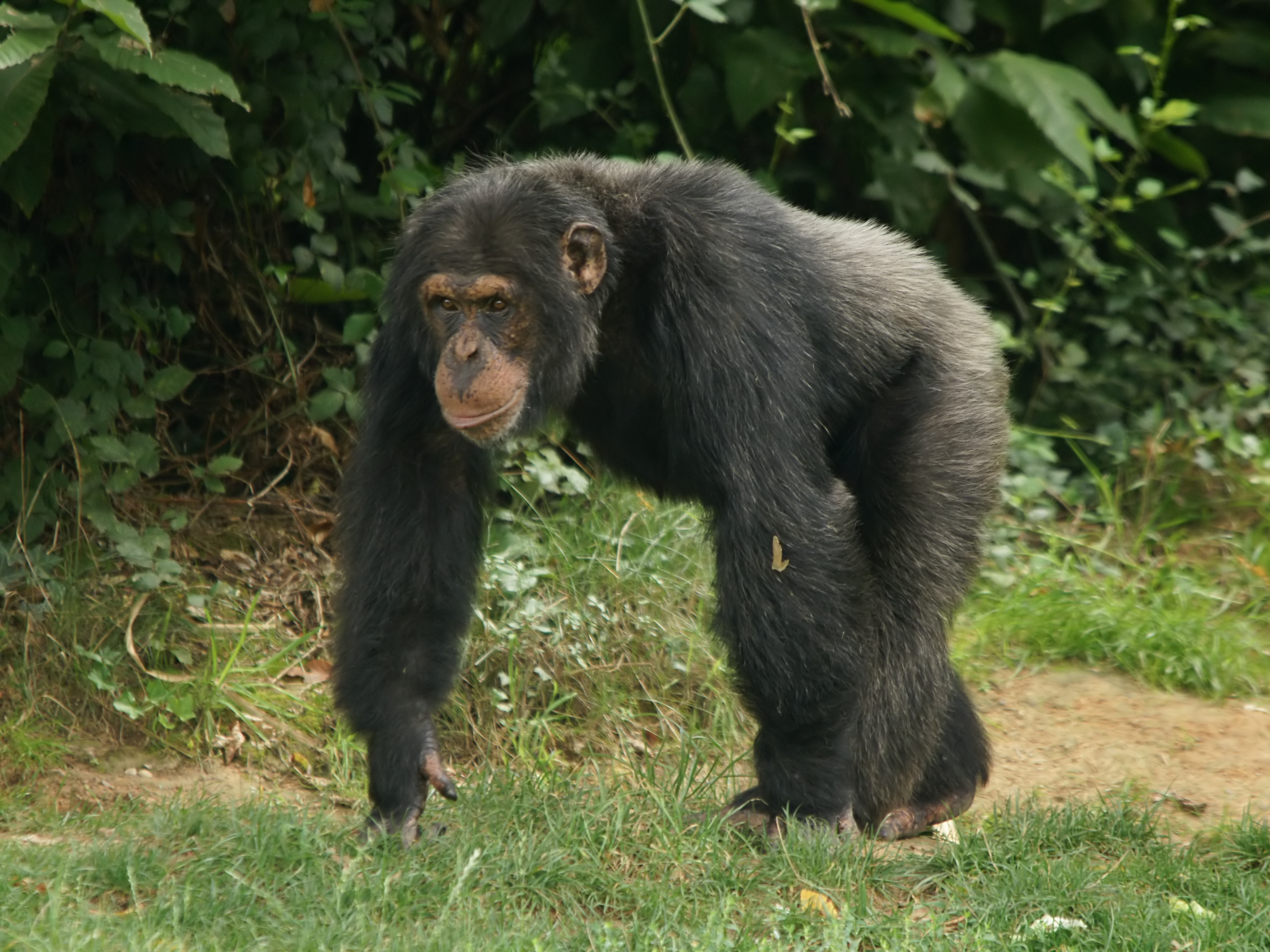
Chimpanzee

== Order: Rodentia (rodents) ==
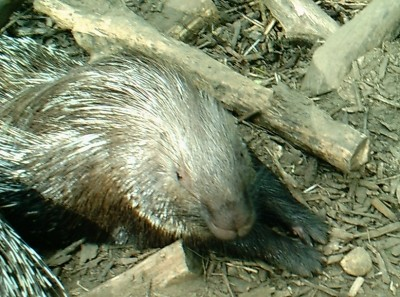
Cape porcupine

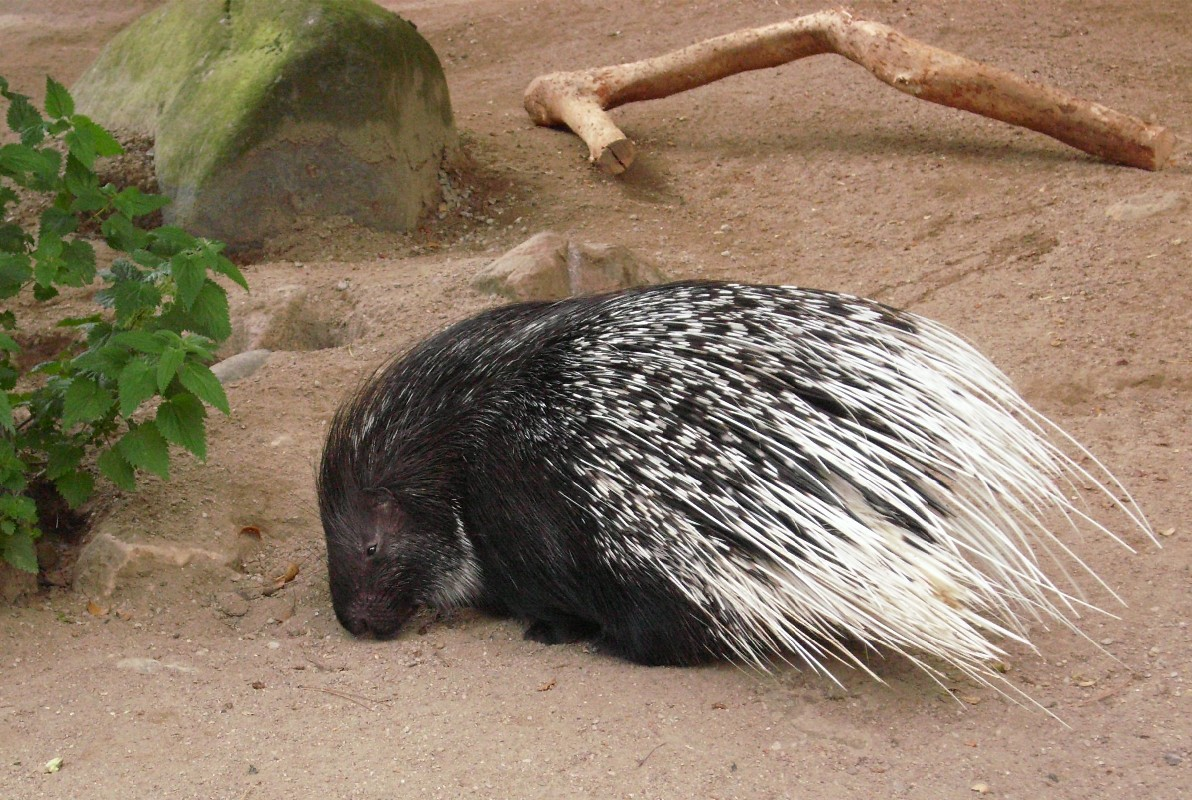
Crested porcupine

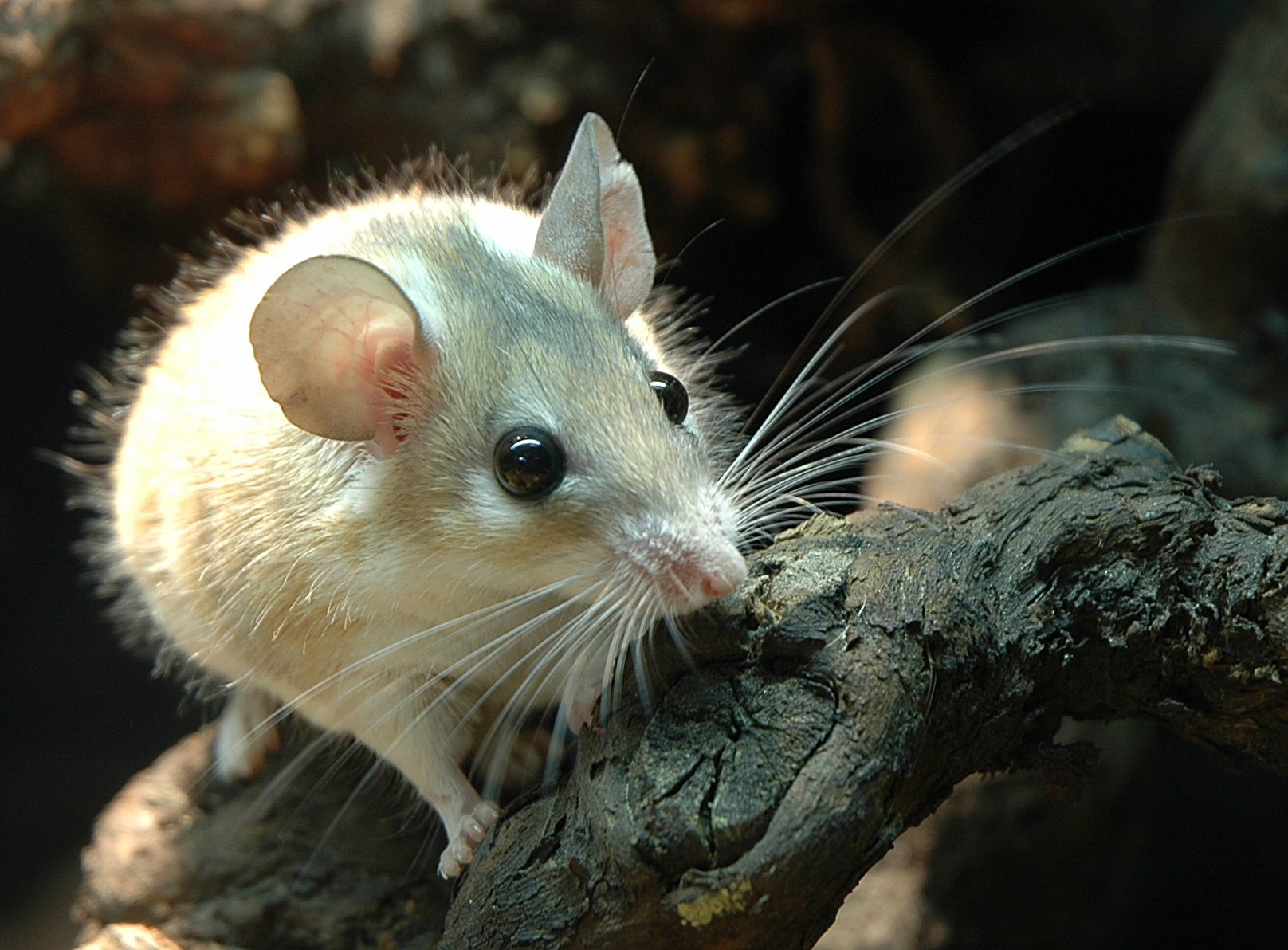
Spiny mouse

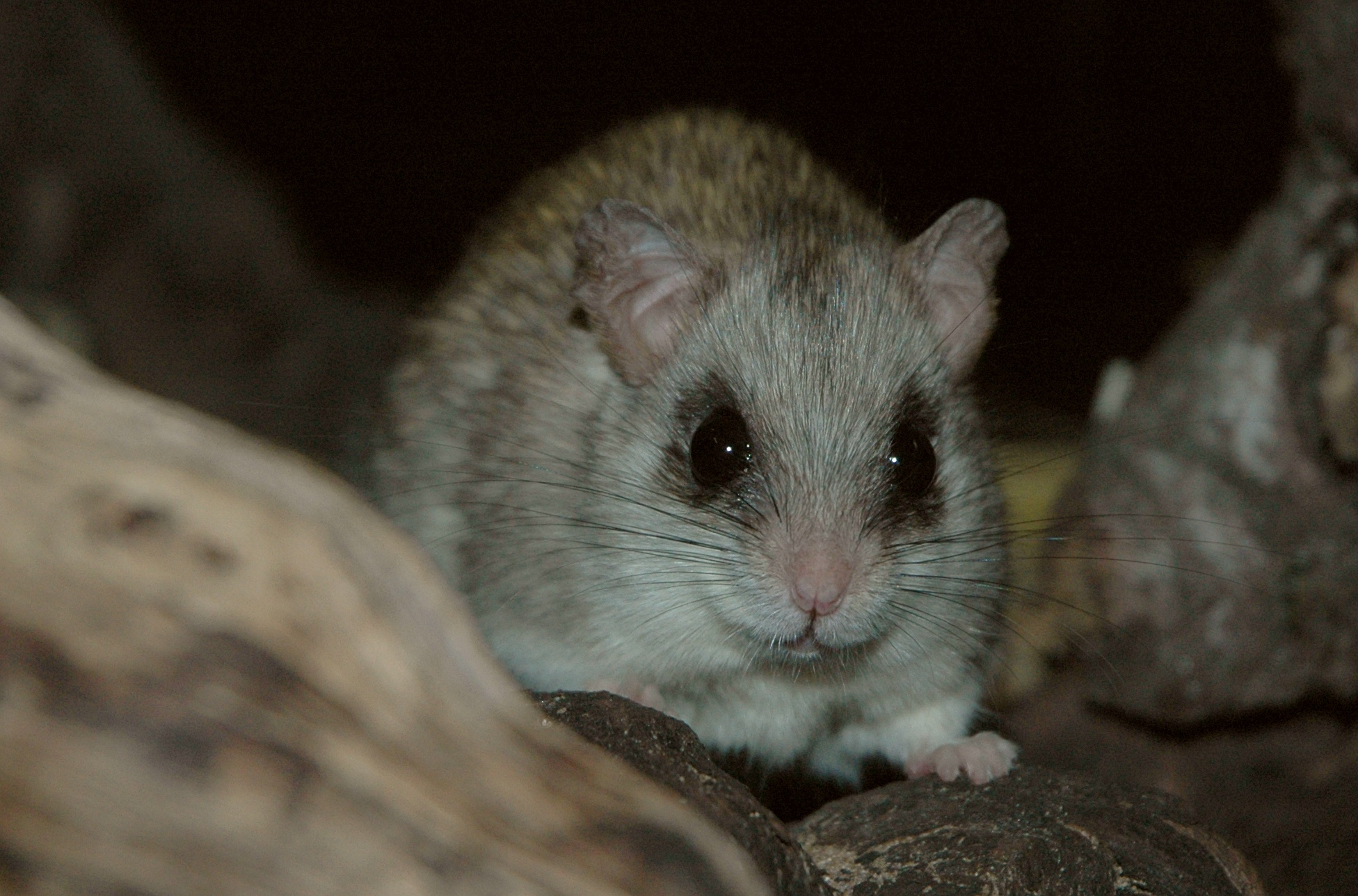
Acacia rat

Rodents make up the largest order of mammals, with over 40% of mammalian species. They have two incisors in the upper and lower jaw which grow continually and must be kept short by gnawing. Most rodents are small though the capybara can weigh up to 45 kg (99 lb).

- Suborder: Hystricognathi
  - Family: Bathyergidae
    - Genus: Cryptomys
      - Common mole-rat, Cryptomys hottentotus LC
    - Genus: Heliophobius
      - Silvery mole-rat, Heliophobius argenteocinereus LC
  - Family: Hystricidae (Old World porcupines)
    - Genus: Atherurus
      - African brush-tailed porcupine, Atherurus africanus LC
    - Genus: Hystrix
      - Cape porcupine, Hystrix africaeaustralis LC
      - Crested porcupine, Hystrix cristata LC
  - Family: Thryonomyidae (cane rats)
    - Genus: Thryonomys
      - Lesser cane rat, Thryonomys gregorianus LC
      - Greater cane rat, Thryonomys swinderianus LC
- Suborder: Sciurognathi
  - Family: Anomaluridae
    - Subfamily: Anomalurinae
      - Genus: Anomalurus
        - Lord Derby's scaly-tailed squirrel, Anomalurus derbianus LC
    - Subfamily: Zenkerellinae
      - Genus: Idiurus
        - Long-eared flying mouse, Idiurus macrotis LC
  - Family: Pedetidae (spring hare)
    - Genus: Pedetes
      - Springhare, Pedetes surdaster LC
  - Family: Sciuridae (squirrels)
    - Subfamily: Xerinae
      - Tribe: Xerini
        - Genus: Xerus
          - Striped ground squirrel, Xerus erythropus LC
          - Unstriped ground squirrel, Xerus rutilus LC
      - Tribe: Protoxerini
        - Genus: Heliosciurus
          - Gambian sun squirrel, Heliosciurus gambianus LC
          - Mutable sun squirrel, Heliosciurus mutabilis LC
          - Red-legged sun squirrel, Heliosciurus rufobrachium LC
          - Zanj sun squirrel, Heliosciurus undulatus DD
        - Genus: Paraxerus
          - Boehm's bush squirrel, Paraxerus boehmi LC
          - Smith's bush squirrel, Paraxerus cepapi LC
          - Striped bush squirrel, Paraxerus flavovittis DD
          - Black and red bush squirrel, Paraxerus lucifer DD
          - Ochre bush squirrel, Paraxerus ochraceus LC
          - Red bush squirrel, Paraxerus palliatus LC
          - Swynnerton's bush squirrel, Paraxerus vexillarius VU
        - Genus: Protoxerus
          - Forest giant squirrel, Protoxerus stangeri LC
  - Family: Gliridae (dormice)
    - Subfamily: Graphiurinae
      - Genus: Graphiurus
        - Lorrain dormouse, Graphiurus lorraineus LC
        - Small-eared dormouse, Graphiurus microtis LC
        - Kellen's dormouse, Graphiurus kelleni LC
  - Family: Spalacidae
    - Subfamily: Tachyoryctinae
      - Genus: Tachyoryctes
        - Demon African mole-rat, Tachyoryctes daemon LC
  - Family: Nesomyidae
    - Subfamily: Dendromurinae
      - Genus: Dendromus
        - Montane African climbing mouse, Dendromus insignis LC
        - Gray climbing mouse, Dendromus melanotis LC
        - Brants's climbing mouse, Dendromus mesomelas LC
        - Chestnut climbing mouse, Dendromus mystacalis LC
        - Nyika climbing mouse, Dendromus nyikae LC
      - Genus: Steatomys
        - Tiny fat mouse, Steatomys parvus LC
        - Fat mouse, Steatomys pratensis LC
    - Subfamily: Cricetomyinae
      - Genus: Beamys
        - Lesser hamster-rat, Beamys hindei NT
        - Greater hamster-rat, Beamys major NT
      - Genus: Cricetomys
        - Emin's pouched rat, Cricetomys emini LC
        - Gambian pouched rat, Cricetomys gambianus LC
      - Genus: Saccostomus
        - South African pouched mouse, Saccostomus campestris LC
        - Mearns's pouched mouse, Saccostomus mearnsi LC
  - Family: Cricetidae
    - Subfamily: Lophiomyinae
      - Genus: Lophiomys
        - Maned rat, Lophiomys imhausi LC
  - Family: Muridae (mice, rats, voles, gerbils, hamsters, etc.)
    - Subfamily: Deomyinae
      - Genus: Acomys
        - Fiery spiny mouse, Acomys ignitus LC
        - Kemp's spiny mouse, Acomys kempi LC
        - Spiny mouse, Acomys spinosissimus LC
        - Wilson's spiny mouse, Acomys wilsoni LC
      - Genus: Lophuromys
        - Yellow-spotted brush-furred rat, Lophuromys flavopunctatus LC
        - Rusty-bellied brush-furred rat, Lophuromys sikapusi LC
    - Subfamily: Otomyinae
      - Genus: Otomys
        - Angoni vlei rat, Otomys angoniensis LC
        - Dent's vlei rat, Otomys denti NT
        - Tanzanian vlei rat, Otomys lacustris NT
        - Afroalpine vlei rat, Otomys orestes DD
        - Uzungwe vlei rat, Otomys uzungwensis EN
    - Subfamily: Gerbillinae
      - Genus: Gerbillus
        - Harwood's gerbil, Gerbillus harwoodi LC
        - Least gerbil, Gerbillus pusillus LC
      - Genus: Tatera
        - Boehm's gerbil, Tatera boehmi LC
        - Gorongoza gerbil, Tatera inclusa LC
        - Bushveld gerbil, Tatera leucogaster LC
        - Black-tailed gerbil, Tatera nigricauda LC
        - Fringe-tailed gerbil, Tatera robusta LC
        - Savanna gerbil, Tatera valida LC
      - Genus: Taterillus
        - Harrington's gerbil, Taterillus harringtoni LC
    - Subfamily: Murinae
      - Genus: Aethomys
        - Red rock rat, Aethomys chrysophilus LC
        - Hinde's rock rat, Aethomys hindei LC
        - Kaiser's rock rat, Aethomys kaiseri LC
      - Genus: Arvicanthis
        - Nairobi grass rat, Arvicanthis nairobae LC
        - African grass rat, Arvicanthis niloticus LC
        - Neumann's grass rat, Arvicanthis neumanni DD
      - Genus: Dasymys
        - African marsh rat, Dasymys incomtus LC
      - Genus: Grammomys
        - Woodland thicket rat, Grammomys dolichurus LC
        - Ruwenzori thicket rat, Grammomys ibeanus LC
        - Macmillan's thicket rat, Grammomys macmillani LC
      - Genus: Hylomyscus
        - Montane wood mouse, Hylomyscus denniae LC
        - Stella wood mouse, Hylomyscus stella LC
      - Genus: Lemniscomys
        - Single-striped grass mouse, Lemniscomys rosalia LC
        - Typical striped grass mouse, Lemniscomys striatus LC
        - Heuglin's striped grass mouse, Lemniscomys zebra LC
      - Genus: Mastomys
        - Natal multimammate mouse, Mastomys natalensis LC
        - Dwarf multimammate mouse, Mastomys pernanus DD
      - Genus: Mus
        - African pygmy mouse, Mus minutoides LC
        - Neave's mouse, Mus neavei DD
        - Thomas's pygmy mouse, Mus sorella LC
        - Delicate mouse, Mus tenellus LC
        - Gray-bellied pygmy mouse, Mus triton LC
      - Genus: Mylomys
        - African groove-toothed rat, Mylomys dybowskii LC
      - Genus: Myomyscus
        - Brockman's rock mouse, Myomyscus brockmani LC
      - Genus: Oenomys
        - Common rufous-nosed rat, Oenomys hypoxanthus LC
      - Genus: Pelomys
        - Creek groove-toothed swamp rat, Pelomys fallax LC
        - Hopkins's groove-toothed swamp rat, Pelomys hopkinsi VU
        - Least groove-toothed swamp rat, Pelomys minor LC
      - Genus: Praomys
        - Delectable soft-furred mouse, Praomys delectorum NT
        - Jackson's soft-furred mouse, Praomys jacksoni LC
      - Genus: Rhabdomys
        - Four-striped grass mouse, Rhabdomys pumilio LC
      - Genus: Thallomys
        - Loring's rat, Thallomys loringi LC
        - Acacia rat, Thallomys paedulcus LC
      - Genus: Zelotomys
        - Hildegarde's broad-headed mouse, Zelotomys hildegardeae LC

== Order: Lagomorpha (lagomorphs) ==
The lagomorphs comprise two families, Leporidae (hares and rabbits), and Ochotonidae (pikas). Though they can resemble rodents, and were classified as a superfamily in that order until the early 20th century, they have since been considered a separate order. They differ from rodents in a number of physical characteristics, such as having four incisors in the upper jaw rather than two.

- Family: Leporidae (rabbits, hares)
  - Genus: Pronolagus
    - Smith's red rock hare, Pronolagus rupestris LR/lc
  - Genus: Lepus
    - Cape hare, Lepus capensis LR/lc
    - African savanna hare, Lepus microtis LR/lc

== Order: Eulipotyphla (shrews, moles, hedgehogs and gymnures) ==
The order Eulipotyphla constitutes four families, two of which are found in Tanzania. The Soricidae family are made up of shrews, whilst the Erinaceidae family are composed of the hedgehogs and gymnures. Hedgehogs are easily recognised by their spines whilst the shrews are more rat-like in appearance.

- Family: Erinaceidae (hedgehogs)
  - Subfamily: Erinaceinae
    - Genus: Atelerix
      - Four-toed hedgehog, Atelerix albiventris LR/lc
- Family: Soricidae (shrews)
  - Subfamily: Crocidurinae
    - Genus: Crocidura
      - East African highland shrew, Crocidura allex LC
      - Reddish-gray musk shrew, Crocidura cyanea LC
      - Desperate shrew, Crocidura desperata EN
      - Elgon shrew, Crocidura elgonius LC
      - Fischer's shrew, Crocidura fischeri DD
      - Bicolored musk shrew, Crocidura fuscomurina LC
      - Peters's musk shrew, Crocidura gracilipes DD
      - Hildegarde's shrew, Crocidura hildegardeae LC
      - Lesser red musk shrew, Crocidura hirta LC
      - Moonshine shrew, Crocidura luna LC
      - Kilimanjaro shrew, Crocidura monax DD
      - Montane white-toothed shrew, Crocidura montis LC
      - Savanna dwarf shrew, Crocidura nanilla LC
      - African giant shrew, Crocidura olivieri LC
      - Small-footed shrew, Crocidura parvipes LC
      - Roosevelt's shrew, Crocidura roosevelti LC
      - Lesser gray-brown musk shrew, Crocidura silacea LC
      - Tanzanian shrew, Crocidura tansaniana VU
      - Telford's shrew, Crocidura telfordi EN
      - Turbo shrew, Crocidura turba LC
      - Usambara shrew, Crocidura usambarae EN
      - Xanthippe's shrew, Crocidura xantippe LC
    - Genus: Suncus
      - Least dwarf shrew, Suncus infinitesimus LC
      - Greater dwarf shrew, Suncus lixus LC
      - Lesser dwarf shrew, Suncus varilla LC
    - Genus: Sylvisorex
      - Grant's forest shrew, Sylvisorex granti LC
      - Howell's forest shrew, Sylvisorex howelli VU
      - Johnston's forest shrew, Sylvisorex johnstoni LC
      - Climbing shrew, Sylvisorex megalura LC
  - Subfamily: Myosoricinae
    - Genus: Myosorex
      - Geata mouse shrew, Myosorex geata DD
      - Kihaule's mouse shrew, Myosorex kihaulei EN
      - Kilimanjaro mouse shrew, Myosorex zinki VU

== Order: Chiroptera (bats) ==
Bats are unique among the mammals in that they are capable of sustained flight. Bats are instantly recognisable by the presence of a flight membrane which stretches between elongated bones in the hand and wrist forming the wing structure. Whilst we do not tend to think of bats as a "typical mammal", bats account for over 20% of all mammals species. Their extensive radiation and great diversity can be attributed to the evolutionary innovation of flight.

- Family: Pteropodidae (flying foxes, Old World fruit bats)
  - Subfamily: Pteropodinae
    - Genus: Eidolon
      - Straw-coloured fruit bat, Eidolon helvum LC
    - Genus: Epomophorus
      - Peters's epauletted fruit bat, Epomophorus crypturus LC
      - Ethiopian epauletted fruit bat, Epomophorus labiatus LC
      - East African epauletted fruit bat, Epomophorus minimus LC
      - Wahlberg's epauletted fruit bat, Epomophorus wahlbergi LC
    - Genus: Epomops
      - Dobson's epauletted fruit bat, Epomops dobsoni LC
      - Franquet's epauletted fruit bat, Epomops franqueti LC
    - Genus: Lissonycteris
      - Angolan rousette, Lissonycteris angolensis LC
    - Genus: Micropteropus
      - Peters's dwarf epauletted fruit bat, Micropteropus pusillus LC
    - Genus: Myonycteris
      - East African little collared fruit bat, Myonycteris relicta VU
    - Genus: Pteropus
      - Seychelles fruit bat, Pteropus seychellensis LC
      - Pemba flying fox, Pteropus voeltzkowi VU
    - Genus: Rousettus
      - Egyptian fruit bat, Rousettus aegyptiacus LC
      - Long-haired rousette, Rousettus lanosus LC
- Family: Vespertilionidae
  - Subfamily: Kerivoulinae
    - Genus: Kerivoula
      - Tanzanian woolly bat, Kerivoula africana EN
      - Damara woolly bat, Kerivoula argentata LC
      - Lesser woolly bat, Kerivoula lanosa LC
  - Subfamily: Myotinae
    - Genus: Myotis
      - Rufous mouse-eared bat, Myotis bocagii LC
      - Cape hairy bat, Myotis tricolor LC
      - Welwitsch's bat, Myotis welwitschii LC
  - Subfamily: Vespertilioninae
    - Genus: Glauconycteris
      - Silvered bat, Glauconycteris argentata LC
      - Butterfly bat, Glauconycteris variegata LC
    - Genus: Laephotis
      - Botswanan long-eared bat, Laephotis botswanae LC
      - De Winton's long-eared bat, Laephotis wintoni LC
    - Genus: Mimetillus
      - Moloney's mimic bat, Mimetillus moloneyi LC
    - Genus: Neoromicia
      - Cape serotine, Neoromicia capensis LC
      - Heller's pipistrelle, Neoromicia helios DD
      - Melck's house bat, Neoromicia melckorum DD
      - Banana pipistrelle, Neoromicia nanus LC
      - Rendall's serotine, Neoromicia rendalli LC
      - Somali Serotine, Neoromicia somalicus LC
      - White-winged serotine, Neoromicia tenuipinnis LC
    - Genus: Nycticeinops
      - Schlieffen's bat, Nycticeinops schlieffeni LC
    - Genus: Pipistrellus
      - Dar es Salaam pipistrelle, Pipistrellus permixtus DD
      - Rüppell's pipistrelle, Pipistrellus rueppelli LC
      - Rusty pipistrelle, Pipistrellus rusticus LC
    - Genus: Scotoecus
      - Light-winged lesser house bat, Scotoecus albofuscus DD
      - Hinde's lesser house bat, Scotoecus hindei DD
      - Dark-winged lesser house bat, Scotoecus hirundo DD
    - Genus: Scotophilus
      - African yellow bat, Scotophilus dinganii LC
      - Schreber's yellow bat, Scotophilus nigrita NT
      - Greenish yellow bat, Scotophilus viridis LC
  - Subfamily: Miniopterinae
    - Genus: Miniopterus
      - Greater long-fingered bat, Miniopterus inflatus LC
      - Least long-fingered bat, Miniopterus minor NT
      - Natal long-fingered bat, Miniopterus natalensis NT
- Family: Molossidae
  - Genus: Chaerephon
    - Gland-tailed free-tailed bat, Chaerephon bemmeleni LC
    - Spotted free-tailed bat, Chaerephon bivittata LC
    - Lappet-eared free-tailed bat, Chaerephon major LC
    - Nigerian free-tailed bat, Chaerephon nigeriae LC
    - Little free-tailed bat, Chaerephon pumila LC
  - Genus: Mops
    - Sierra Leone free-tailed bat, Mops brachypterus LC
    - Angolan free-tailed bat, Mops condylurus LC
    - Midas free-tailed bat, Mops midas LC
  - Genus: Otomops
    - Large-eared free-tailed bat, Otomops martiensseni NT
  - Genus: Tadarida
    - Egyptian free-tailed bat, Tadarida aegyptiaca LC
    - Madagascan large free-tailed bat, Tadarida fulminans LC
    - African giant free-tailed bat, Tadarida ventralis NT
- Family: Emballonuridae
  - Genus: Coleura
    - African sheath-tailed bat, Coleura afra LC
  - Genus: Taphozous
    - Hamilton's tomb bat, Taphozous hamiltoni NT
    - Hildegarde's tomb bat, Taphozous hildegardeae VU
    - Mauritian tomb bat, Taphozous mauritianus LC
    - Naked-rumped tomb bat, Taphozous nudiventris LC
    - Egyptian tomb bat, Taphozous perforatus LC
- Family: Nycteridae
  - Genus: Nycteris
    - Bate's slit-faced bat, Nycteris arge LC
    - Andersen's slit-faced bat, Nycteris aurita DD
    - Large slit-faced bat, Nycteris grandis LC
    - Hairy slit-faced bat, Nycteris hispida LC
    - Intermediate slit-faced bat, Nycteris intermedia NT
    - Large-eared slit-faced bat, Nycteris macrotis LC
    - Dwarf slit-faced bat, Nycteris nana LC
    - Egyptian slit-faced bat, Nycteris thebaica LC
    - Wood's slit-faced bat, Nycteris woodi NT
- Family: Megadermatidae
  - Genus: Cardioderma
    - Heart-nosed bat, Cardioderma cor LC
  - Genus: Lavia
    - Yellow-winged bat, Lavia frons LC
- Family: Rhinolophidae
  - Subfamily: Rhinolophinae
    - Genus: Rhinolophus
      - Blasius's horseshoe bat, R. blasii LC
      - Geoffroy's horseshoe bat, Rhinolophus clivosus LC
      - Darling's horseshoe bat, Rhinolophus darlingi LC
      - Decken's horseshoe bat, Rhinolophus deckenii DD
      - Eloquent horseshoe bat, Rhinolophus eloquens DD
      - Rüppell's horseshoe bat, Rhinolophus fumigatus LC
      - Hildebrandt's horseshoe bat, Rhinolophus hildebrandti LC
      - Lander's horseshoe bat, Rhinolophus landeri LC
      - Maendeleo horseshoe bat, Rhinolophus maendeleo DD
      - Bushveld horseshoe bat, Rhinolophus simulator LC
      - Swinny's horseshoe bat, Rhinolophus swinnyi NT
  - Subfamily: Hipposiderinae
    - Genus: Asellia
      - Trident leaf-nosed bat, Asellia tridens LC
    - Genus: Cloeotis
      - Percival's trident bat, Cloeotis percivali VU
    - Genus: Hipposideros
      - Sundevall's roundleaf bat, Hipposideros caffer LC
      - Cyclops roundleaf bat, Hipposideros cyclops LC
      - Giant roundleaf bat, Hipposideros gigas LC
      - Commerson's roundleaf bat, Hipposideros marungensis NT
      - Noack's roundleaf bat, Hipposideros ruber LC
    - Genus: Triaenops
      - Persian trident bat, Triaenops persicus LC

== Order: Pholidota (pangolins) ==
The order Pholidota comprises the eight species of pangolin. Pangolins are anteaters and have the powerful claws, elongated snout and long tongue seen in the other unrelated anteater species.

- Family: Manidae
  - Genus: Manis
    - Giant pangolin, Manis gigantea LR/lc
    - Ground pangolin, Manis temminckii LR/nt
    - Tree pangolin, Manis tricuspis LR/lc

== Order: Cetacea (whales) ==
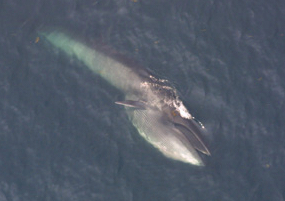
Sei whale

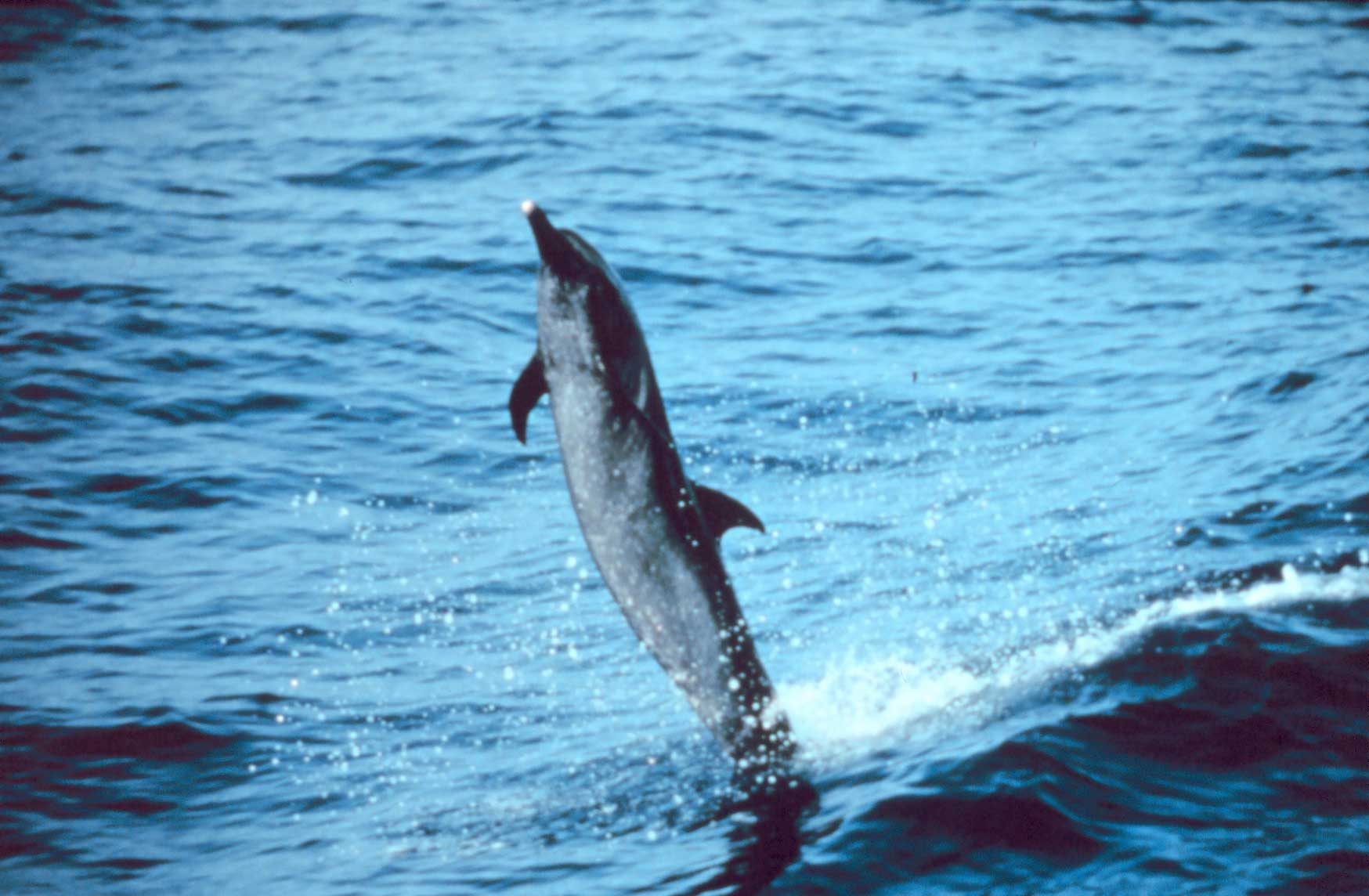
Pantropical spotted dolphin

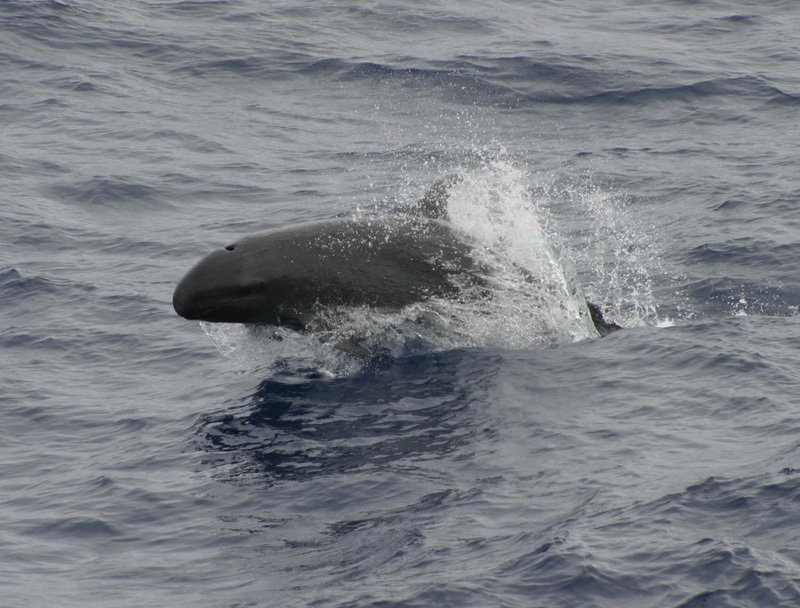
False killer whale

The order Cetacea includes whales, dolphins and porpoises. They are the mammals most fully adapted to aquatic life with a spindle-shaped nearly hairless body, protected by a thick layer of blubber, and forelimbs and tail modified to provide propulsion underwater.

- Suborder: Mysticeti
  - Family: Balaenopteridae
    - Subfamily: Balaenopterinae
      - Genus: Balaenoptera
        - Common minke whale, Balaenoptera acutorostrata LC
        - Sei whale, Balaenoptera borealis EN
        - Bryde's whale, Balaenoptera edeni DD
        - Blue whale, Balaenoptera musculus EN
        - Fin whale, Balaenoptera physalus EN
    - Subfamily: Megapterinae
      - Genus: Megaptera
        - Humpback whale, Megaptera novaeangliae VU
- Suborder: Odontoceti
  - Superfamily: Platanistoidea
    - Family: Physeteridae
      - Genus: Physeter
        - Sperm whale, Physeter macrocephalus VU
    - Family: Kogiidae
      - Genus: Kogia
        - Pygmy sperm whale, Kogia breviceps LR/lc
        - Dwarf sperm whale, Kogia sima LR/lc
    - Family: Ziphidae
      - Subfamily: Hyperoodontinae
        - Genus: Indopacetus
          - Longman's beaked whale, Indopacetus pacificus DD
        - Genus: Ziphius
          - Cuvier's beaked whale, Ziphius cavirostris DD
        - Genus: Mesoplodon
          - Blainville's beaked whale, Mesoplodon densirostris DD
          - Ginkgo-toothed beaked whale, Mesoplodon ginkgodens DD
    - Family: Delphinidae (marine dolphins)
      - Genus: Steno
        - Rough-toothed dolphin, Steno bredanensis DD
      - Genus: Sousa
        - Indian humpback dolphin, Sousa plumbea DD
      - Genus: Tursiops
        - Indo-Pacific bottlenose dolphin, Tursiops aduncus DD
        - Common bottlenose dolphin, Tursiops truncatus DD
      - Genus: Stenella
        - Pantropical spotted dolphin, Stenella attenuata LR/cd
        - Striped dolphin, Stenella coeruleoalba LR/cd
        - Spinner dolphin, Stenella longirostris LR/cd
      - Genus: Lagenodelphis
        - Fraser's dolphin, Lagenodelphis hosei DD
      - Genus: Grampus
        - Risso's dolphin, Grampus griseus DD
      - Genus: Feresa
        - Pygmy killer whale, Feresa attenuata DD
      - Genus: Pseudorca
        - False killer whale, Pseudorca crassidens LR/lc
      - Genus: Orcinus
        - Orca, Orcinus orca LR/cd
      - Genus: Globicephala
        - Short-finned pilot whale, Globicephala macrorhynchus LR/cd
      - Genus: Peponocephala
        - Melon-headed whale, Peponocephala electra DD

== Order: Carnivora (carnivorans) ==
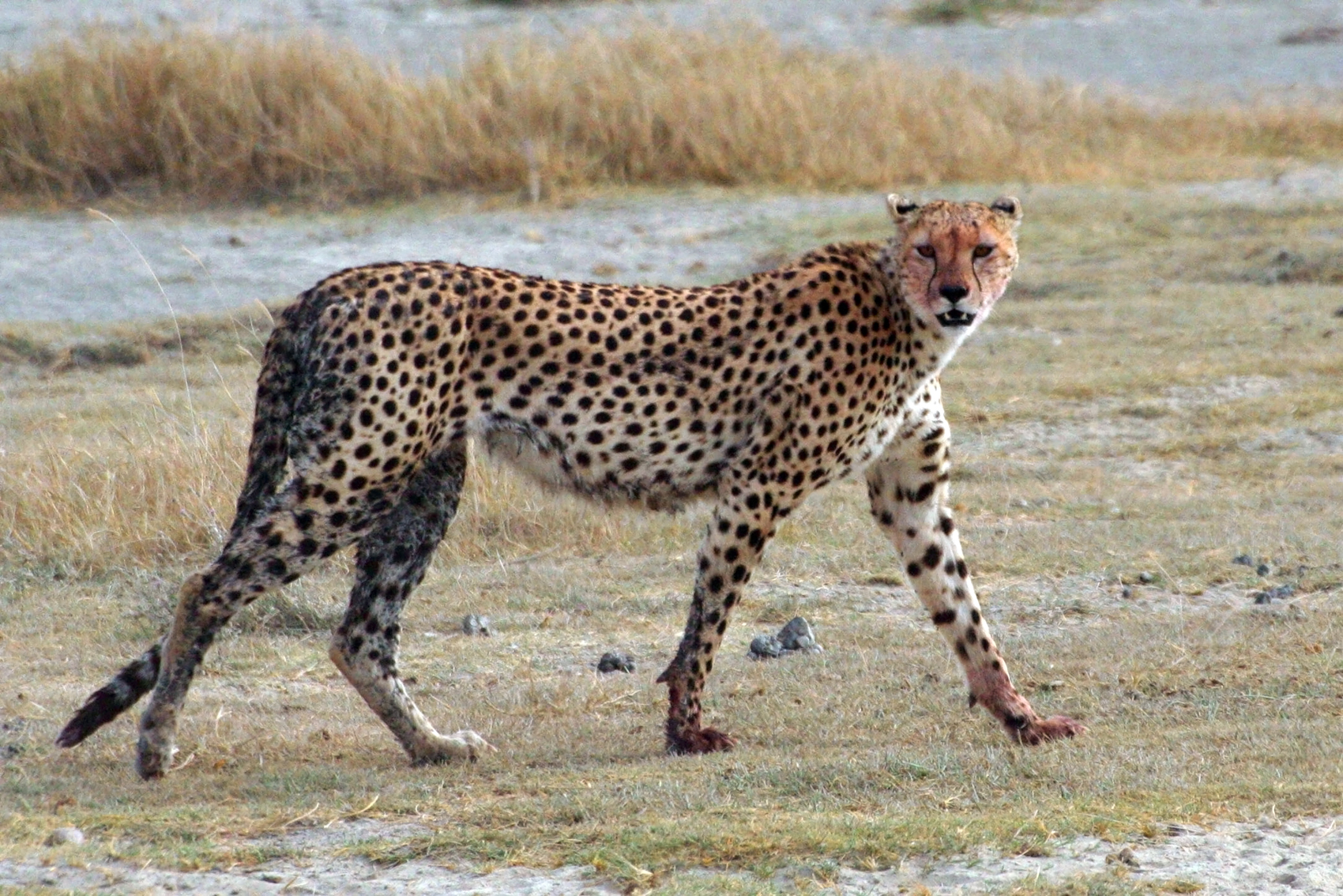
Cheetah

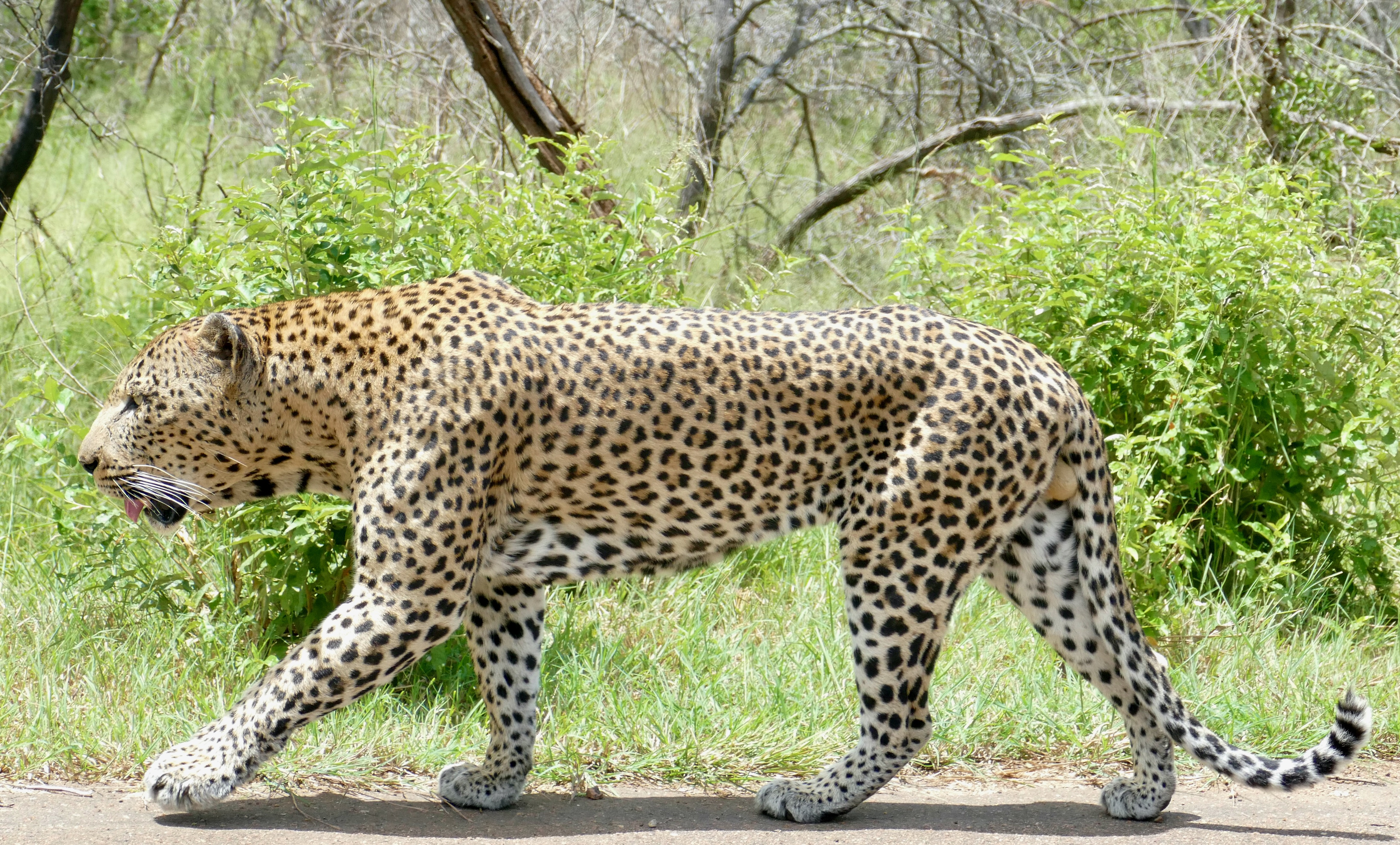
African leopard

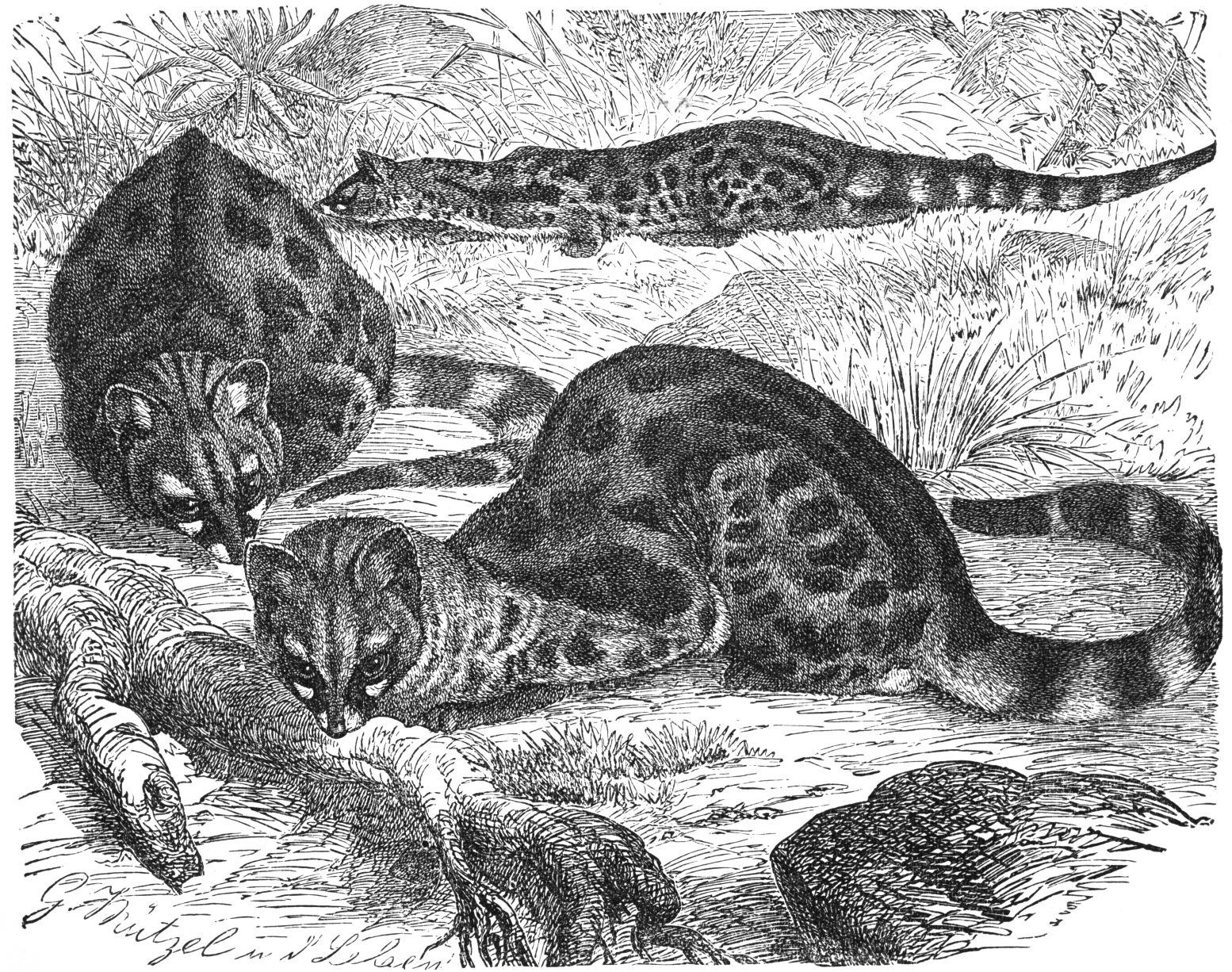
Common genet

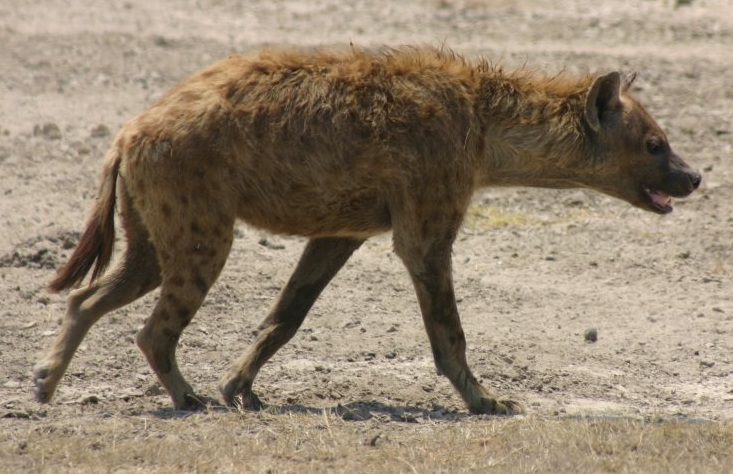
Spotted hyena

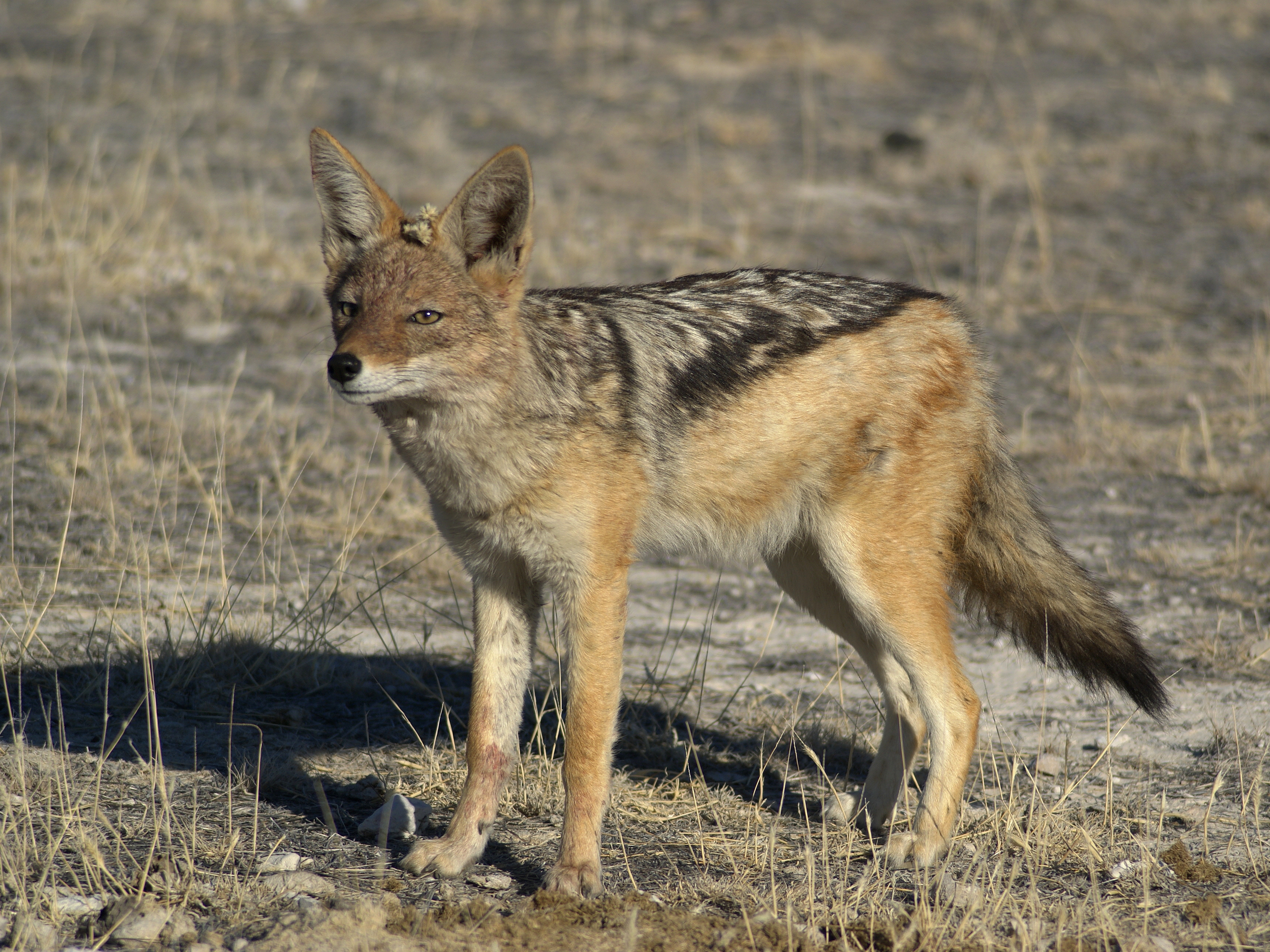
Black-backed jackal

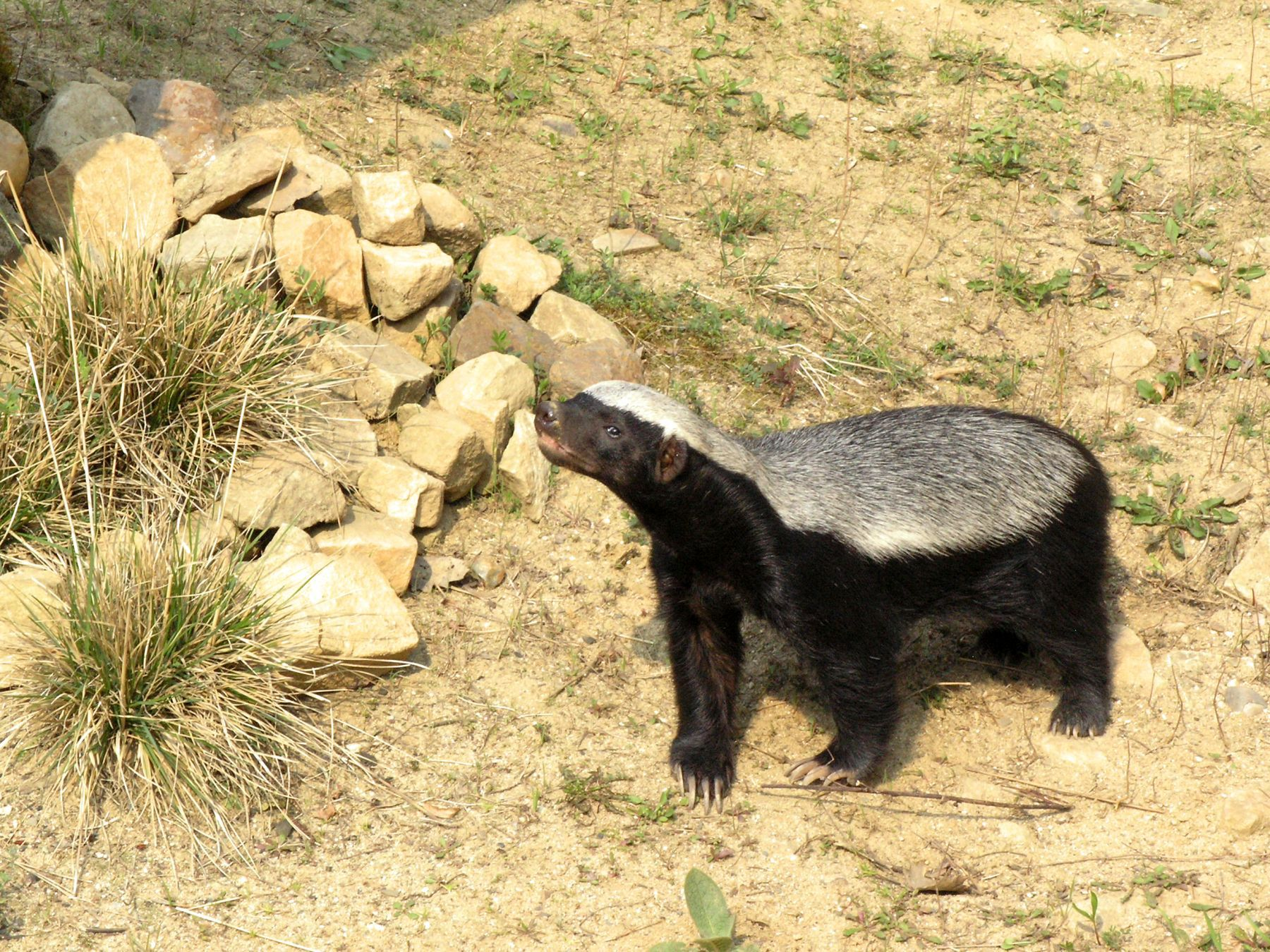
Honey badger

- Suborder: Feliformia
  - Family: Felidae (cats)
    - Subfamily: Felinae
      - Genus: Acinonyx
        - Cheetah, Acinonyx jubatus VU
      - Genus: Caracal
        - Caracal, C. caracal LC
      - Genus: Felis
        - African wildcat, F. lybica LC
      - Genus: Leptailurus
        - Serval, L. serval LC
    - Subfamily: Pantherinae
      - Genus: Panthera
        - Lion, P. leo VU
        - Leopard, P. pardus VU
          - African leopard, P. p. pardus
          - Zanzibar leopard, P. p. pardus, possibly EX
  - Family: Viverridae
    - Subfamily: Viverrinae
      - Genus: Civettictis
        - African civet, C. civetta LC
      - Genus: Genetta
        - Angolan genet, Genetta angolensis LC
        - Common genet, Genetta genetta LC
        - Rusty-spotted genet, Genetta maculata LC
        - Servaline genet, Genetta servalina LC
  - Family: Nandiniidae
    - Genus: Nandinia
      - African palm civet, Nandinia binotata LC
  - Family: Herpestidae (mongooses)
    - Genus: Atilax
      - Marsh mongoose, Atilax paludinosus LC
    - Genus: Bdeogale
      - Bushy-tailed mongoose, B. crassicauda LC
      - Jackson's mongoose, Bdeogale jacksoni VU
    - Genus: Helogale
      - Common dwarf mongoose, Helogale parvula LC
    - Genus: Herpestes
      - Egyptian mongoose, Herpestes ichneumon LC
      - Common slender mongoose, Herpestes sanguinea LC
    - Genus: Mungos
      - Banded mongoose, Mungos mungo LClc
    - Genus: Rhynchogale
      - Meller's mongoose, Rhynchogale melleri LC
    - Genus: Urva
      - Small Indian mongoose, Urva auropunctata LC introduced
    - Genus: Xenogale
      - Long-nosed mongoose, Xenogale naso LC
  - Family: Hyaenidae (hyaenas)
    - Genus: Crocuta
      - Spotted hyena, Crocuta crocuta LC
    - Genus: Hyaena
      - Striped hyena, Hyaena hyaena NT
    - Genus: Proteles
      - Aardwolf, Proteles cristatus LC
- Suborder: Caniformia
  - Family: Canidae (dogs, foxes)
    - Genus: Canis
      - African golden wolf, Canis lupaster LC
    - Genus: Lupulella
      - Side-striped jackal, L. adusta LC
      - Black-backed jackal, L. mesomelas LC
    - Genus: Otocyon
      - Bat-eared fox, Otocyon megalotis LC
    - Genus: Lycaon
      - African wild dog, Lycaon pictus EN
  - Family: Mustelidae (mustelids)
    - Genus: Ictonyx
      - Striped polecat, Ictonyx striatus LC
    - Genus: Poecilogale
      - African striped weasel, Poecilogale albinucha LC
    - Genus: Mellivora
      - Honey badger, Mellivora capensis LC
    - Genus: Hydrictis
      - Speckle-throated otter, Hydrictis maculicollis LC
    - Genus: Aonyx
      - African clawless otter, Aonyx capensis LC

== Order: Perissodactyla (odd-toed ungulates) ==
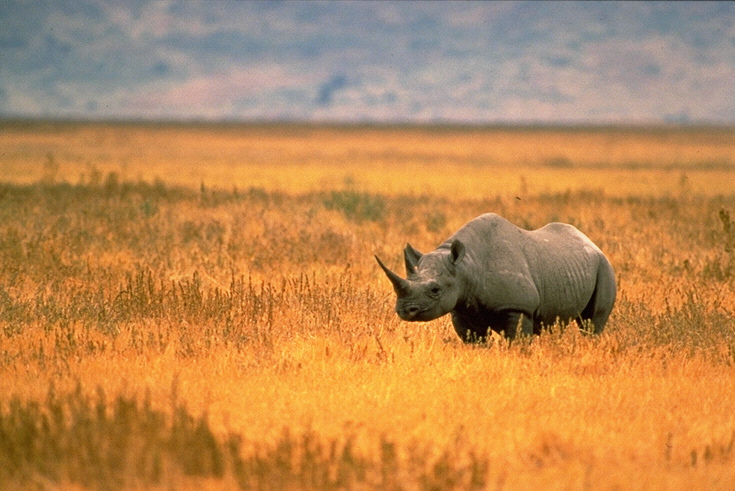
Black rhinoceros

The odd-toed ungulates are browsing and grazing mammals. They are usually large to very large, and have relatively simple stomachs and a large middle toe.

- Family: Equidae (horses etc.)
  - Genus: Equus
    - Plains zebra, Equus quagga NT
- Family: Rhinocerotidae
  - Genus: Diceros
    - Black rhinoceros, Diceros bicornis CR

== Order: Artiodactyla (even-toed ungulates) ==
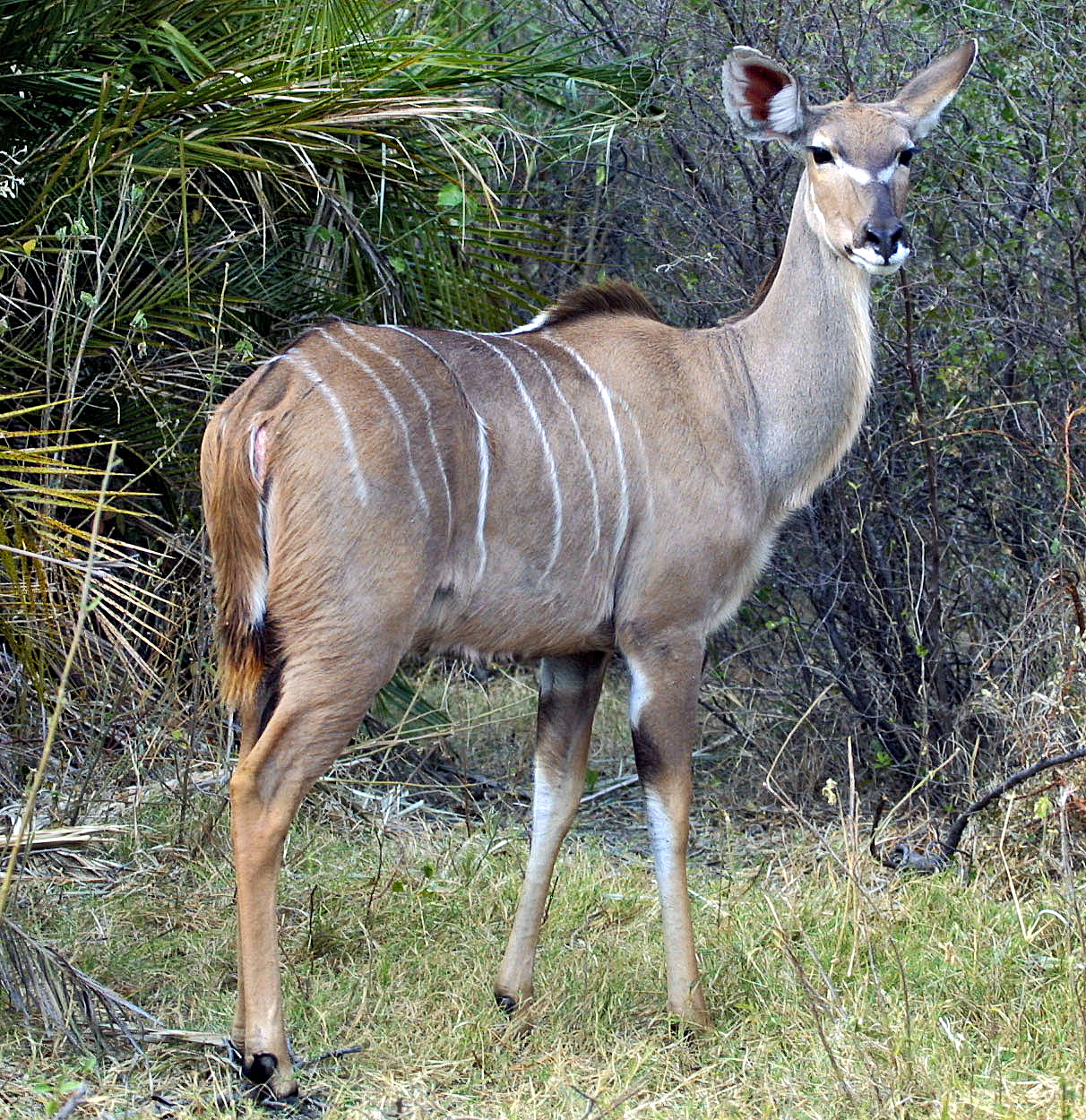
Greater kudu

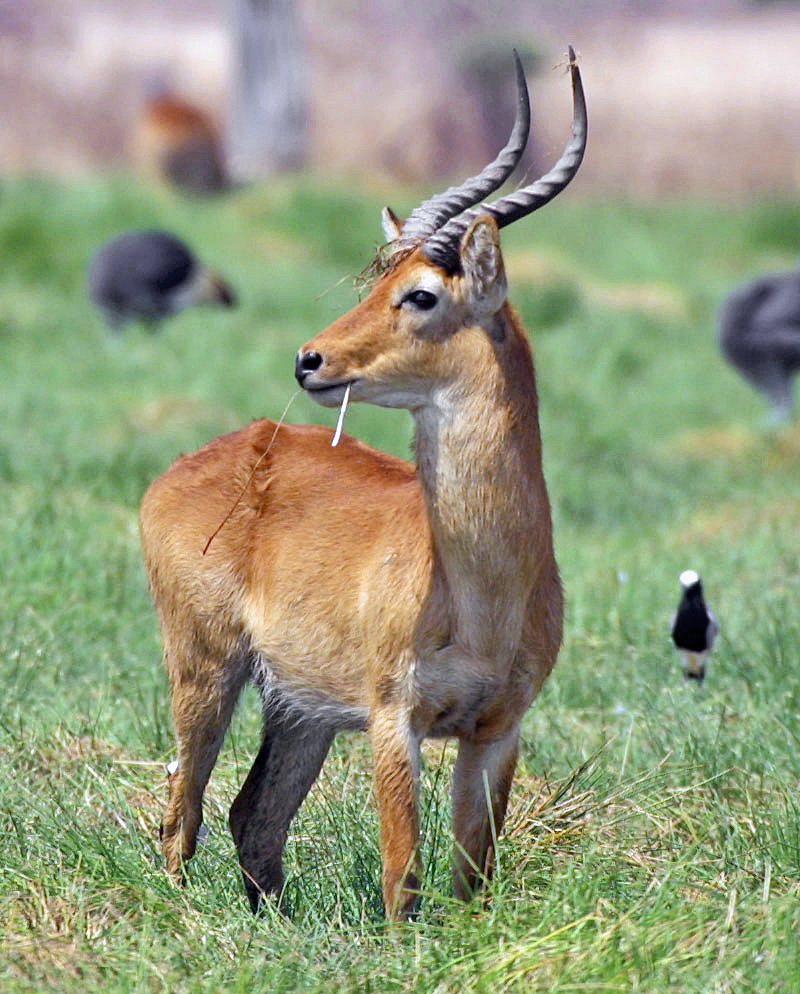
Puku

The even-toed ungulates are ungulates whose weight is borne about equally by the third and fourth toes, rather than mostly or entirely by the third as in perissodactyls. There are about 220 artiodactyl species, including many that are of great economic importance to humans.

- Family: Suidae (pigs)
  - Subfamily: Phacochoerinae
    - Genus: Phacochoerus
      - Common warthog, Phacochoerus africanus LR/lc
  - Subfamily: Suinae
    - Genus: Hylochoerus
      - Giant forest hog, Hylochoerus meinertzhageni LR/lc
    - Genus: Potamochoerus
      - Bushpig, Potamochoerus larvatus LR/lc
- Family: Hippopotamidae (hippopotamuses)
  - Genus: Hippopotamus
    - Hippopotamus, Hippopotamus amphibius VU
- Family: Giraffidae (giraffe, okapi)
  - Genus: Giraffa
    - Masai giraffe, Giraffa tippelskirchi VU
- Family: Bovidae (cattle, antelope, sheep, goats)
  - Subfamily: Alcelaphinae
    - Genus: Alcelaphus
      - Hartebeest, A. buselaphus LC
      - Lichtenstein's hartebeest, Alcelaphus lichtensteinii LR/cd
    - Genus: Connochaetes
      - Blue wildebeest, Connochaetes taurinus LR/cd
    - Genus: Damaliscus
      - Topi, Damaliscus lunatus LR/cd
  - Subfamily: Antilopinae
    - Genus: Gazella
      - Grant's gazelle, Gazella granti LR/cd
      - Thomson's gazelle, Gazella thomsonii LR/cd
    - Genus: Litocranius
      - Gerenuk, Litocranius walleri LR/cd
    - Genus: Madoqua
      - Kirk's dik-dik, Madoqua kirkii LR/lc
    - Genus: Neotragus
      - Suni, Neotragus moschatus LR/cd
    - Genus: Oreotragus
      - Klipspringer, Oreotragus oreotragus LR/cd
    - Genus: Ourebia
      - Oribi, Ourebia ourebi LR/cd
    - Genus: Raphicerus
      - Steenbok, Raphicerus campestris LR/lc
      - Sharpe's grysbok, Raphicerus sharpei LR/cd
  - Subfamily: Bovinae
    - Genus: Syncerus
      - African buffalo, S. caffer NT
    - Genus: Tragelaphus
      - Lesser kudu, Tragelaphus imberbis LR/cd
      - Common eland, Tragelaphus oryx LR/cd
      - Bushbuck, Tragelaphus scriptus LR/lc
      - Sitatunga, Tragelaphus spekii LR/nt
      - Greater kudu, Tragelaphus strepsiceros LR/cd
  - Subfamily: Cephalophinae
    - Genus: Cephalophus
      - Aders's duiker, Cephalophus adersi CR
      - Peters's duiker, Cephalophus callipygus LR/nt
      - Harvey's duiker, Cephalophus harveyi LR/cd
      - Blue duiker, Cephalophus monticola LR/lc
      - Red forest duiker, Cephalophus natalensis LR/cd
      - Abbott's duiker, Cephalophus spadix VU
      - Weyns's duiker, Cephalophus weynsi LR/nt
    - Genus: Sylvicapra
      - Common duiker, Sylvicapra grimmia LR/lc
  - Subfamily: Hippotraginae
    - Genus: Hippotragus
      - Roan antelope, Hippotragus equinus LR/cd
      - Sable antelope, Hippotragus niger LR/cd
    - Genus: Oryx
      - East African oryx, Oryx beisa RN
  - Subfamily: Aepycerotinae
    - Genus: Aepyceros
      - Impala, Aepyceros melampus LR/cd
  - Subfamily: Reduncinae
    - Genus: Kobus
      - Waterbuck, Kobus ellipsiprymnus LR/cd
      - Kob, Kobus kob LR/cd
      - Puku, Kobus vardonii LR/cd
    - Genus: Redunca
      - Southern reedbuck, Redunca arundinum LR/cd
      - Mountain reedbuck, Redunca fulvorufula LC
      - Bohor reedbuck, Redunca redunca LR/cd

== See also ==
- List of chordate orders
- Mammal classification
- List of mammals described in the 2000s
