= K. africana =

K. africana may refer to:

- Kerivoula africana, the Tanzanian woolly bat, a bat species found only in Tanzania
- Kigelia africana, a flowering plant species found throughout tropical Africa

== See also ==
- Africana (disambiguation)
