= Ghana rufous-nosed rat =

Conservation status
- Data Deficient (IUCN 3.1)

Scientific classification
- Kingdom: Animalia
- Phylum: Chordata
- Class: Mammalia
- Order: Rodentia
- Family: Muridae
- Genus: Oenomys
- Species: O. ornatus

Binomial name
- Oenomys ornatus Thomas, 1911

Species of rodent

The Ghana rufous-nosed rat (Oenomys ornatus), also known as the West African Oenomys, is a species of rodent in the family Muridae. It is found in Ivory Coast, Ghana, Guinea, Liberia, and Sierra Leone. Its natural habitats are subtropical or tropical seasonally wet or flooded lowland grassland and seasonally flooded agricultural land, it has also been observed in secondary high forest habitat.

== Population ==
According to the IUCN Red List, the Ghana rufous-nosed rat "is considered to be a rare species" and is "known only from a few localities in each of the countries where it has been recorded".

== Ecology ==
The Ghana rufous-nosed rat is described as a good climber.
