= Angolan marsh rat =

Conservation status
- Data Deficient (IUCN 3.1)

Scientific classification
- Kingdom: Animalia
- Phylum: Chordata
- Class: Mammalia
- Infraclass: Placentalia
- Order: Rodentia
- Family: Muridae
- Genus: Dasymys
- Species: D. nudipes

Binomial name
- Dasymys nudipes (Peters, 1870)
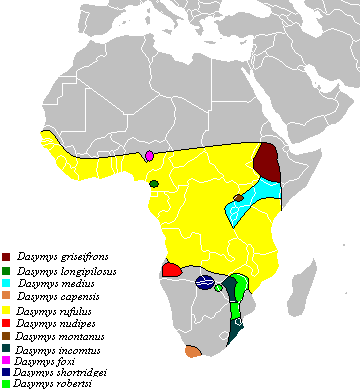
- Distribution of Dasymys species. Dasymys nudipes is shown in red.

Species of rodent

The Angolan marsh rat (Dasymys nudipes) is a species of rodent in the family Muridae. It is found in Angola, Botswana, Namibia, and Zambia. Its natural habitats are subtropical or tropical seasonally wet or flooded lowland grassland and swamps. It is threatened by habitat loss.
