= Tanzanian shaggy rat =

Scientific classification
- Kingdom: Animalia
- Phylum: Chordata
- Class: Mammalia
- Order: Rodentia
- Family: Muridae
- Genus: Dasymys
- Species: D. sua

Binomial name
- Dasymys sua W. Verheyen, Hulselmans, Dierckx, Colyn, Leirs, E. Verheyen, 2003

Species of rodent

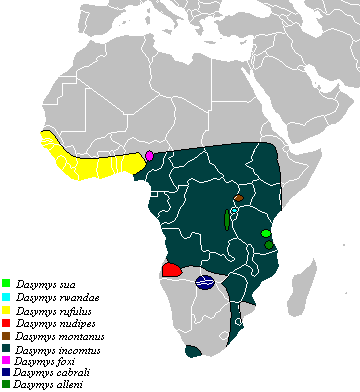
Distribution map of the rodent genus Dasymys based on Verheyen et al. (2003) (see also Image:Dasymys Mullin et al. 2004.png which uses another classification).: Dasymys sua; Dasymys rwandae; Dasymys rufulus; Dasymys nudipes; Dasymys montanus; Dasymys incomtus; Dasymys foxi; Dasymys cabrali; Dasymys alleni

The Tanzanian shaggy rat (Dasymys sua) is a species of shaggy marsh rat endemic to eastern Tanzania, near the Uluguru Mountains.

== Description ==
Covered in soft, shaggy, reddish to brown fur. Broad shaped head with a short muzzle. Rounded ears with a distinct furriness to the interior. Tail is shorter than the head to body length.

== Habitat ==
Dasymys sua thrives in marshes and other wetlands.

== Behavior ==
Dasymys sua is nocturnal, similar to other members of its genus.

== See also ==
- List of mammals of Tanzania
