= Fox's shaggy rat =

Conservation status
- Data Deficient (IUCN 3.1)

Scientific classification
- Kingdom: Animalia
- Phylum: Chordata
- Class: Mammalia
- Infraclass: Placentalia
- Order: Rodentia
- Family: Muridae
- Genus: Dasymys
- Species: D. foxi

Binomial name
- Dasymys foxi Thomas, 1912
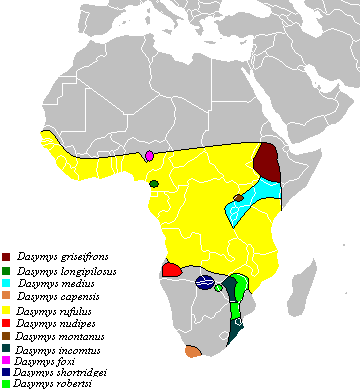
- Distribution of Dasymys species. Dasymys foxi is shown in pink.

Species of mammal

Fox's shaggy rat (Dasymys foxi) is a species of rodent in the family Muridae. It is found only in Nigeria. Its natural habitats are moist savanna, subtropical or tropical seasonally wet or flooded lowland grassland, swampland, and plantations. It is threatened by habitat loss.
