= West African shaggy rat =

Conservation status
- Least Concern (IUCN 3.1)

Scientific classification
- Kingdom: Animalia
- Phylum: Chordata
- Class: Mammalia
- Order: Rodentia
- Family: Muridae
- Genus: Dasymys
- Species: D. rufulus

Binomial name
- Dasymys rufulus Miller, 1900

Species of rodent

The West African shaggy rat (Dasymys rufulus) is a species of rodent in the family Muridae. It is found in Benin, Cameroon, Ivory Coast, Gambia, Ghana, Guinea, Guinea-Bissau, Liberia, Mali, Nigeria, Senegal, Sierra Leone, and Togo. Its natural habitats are subtropical or tropical seasonally wet or flooded lowland grassland and swamps. It is a common species and the International Union for Conservation of Nature has rated its conservation status as being of "least concern".

== Description ==
The West African shaggy rat is a stocky, medium-sized rat with soft, dense, shaggy fur. The eyes are small and dark and the ears small and rounded; both are often invisible amongst the dense fur. The upper parts of head and body are brown to greyish-brown, with a reddish tinge, especially on the mid-part of the head and along the ridge of the back. The under-fur is fine and very dense. The flanks are brown, the individual hairs having buffy tips. The underparts are paler in colour, the individual hairs being grey with whitish tips. There is no sharp demarcation between the upper parts and the underparts. The forefoot has four digits and the hind foot five. The tail is about as long as the head-and-body length; it is ringed by small scales and clad with sparse short bristles. The head-and-body length of this rat averages 145 mm (5.7 in) and the weight averages 78 g (2.75 oz).

== Distribution and habitat ==
The West African shaggy rat is native to tropical West Africa; its range includes Benin, Gambia, Ghana, Guinea, Guinea-Bissau, Ivory Coast, Liberia, Mali, Nigeria, Senegal, Sierra Leone and Togo. It inhabits wetlands and swampy areas, streams, riverbanks, lakesides, young oil-palm plantations and rice fields.

== Ecology ==
The West African shaggy rat is a terrestrial species. It is nocturnal and a good swimmer. It lives in a shallow burrow, the entrance often hidden under a grass tussock. It feeds on grasses, leaves and other plant material. Its breeding habits are unknown.
