= Crawford-Cabral's shaggy rat =

Scientific classification
- Kingdom: Animalia
- Phylum: Chordata
- Class: Mammalia
- Order: Rodentia
- Family: Muridae
- Genus: Dasymys
- Species: D. cabrali

Binomial name
- Dasymys cabrali W. Verheyen, Hulselmans, Dierckx, Colyn, Leirs, E. Verheyen, 2003

Species of rodent

Crawford-Cabral's shaggy rat or Crawford-Cabral's shaggy marsh rat (Dasymys cabrali) is a species of shaggy marsh rat endemic to north-eastern Namibia, near the Okavango River.

== See also ==
- List of mammals of Namibia
