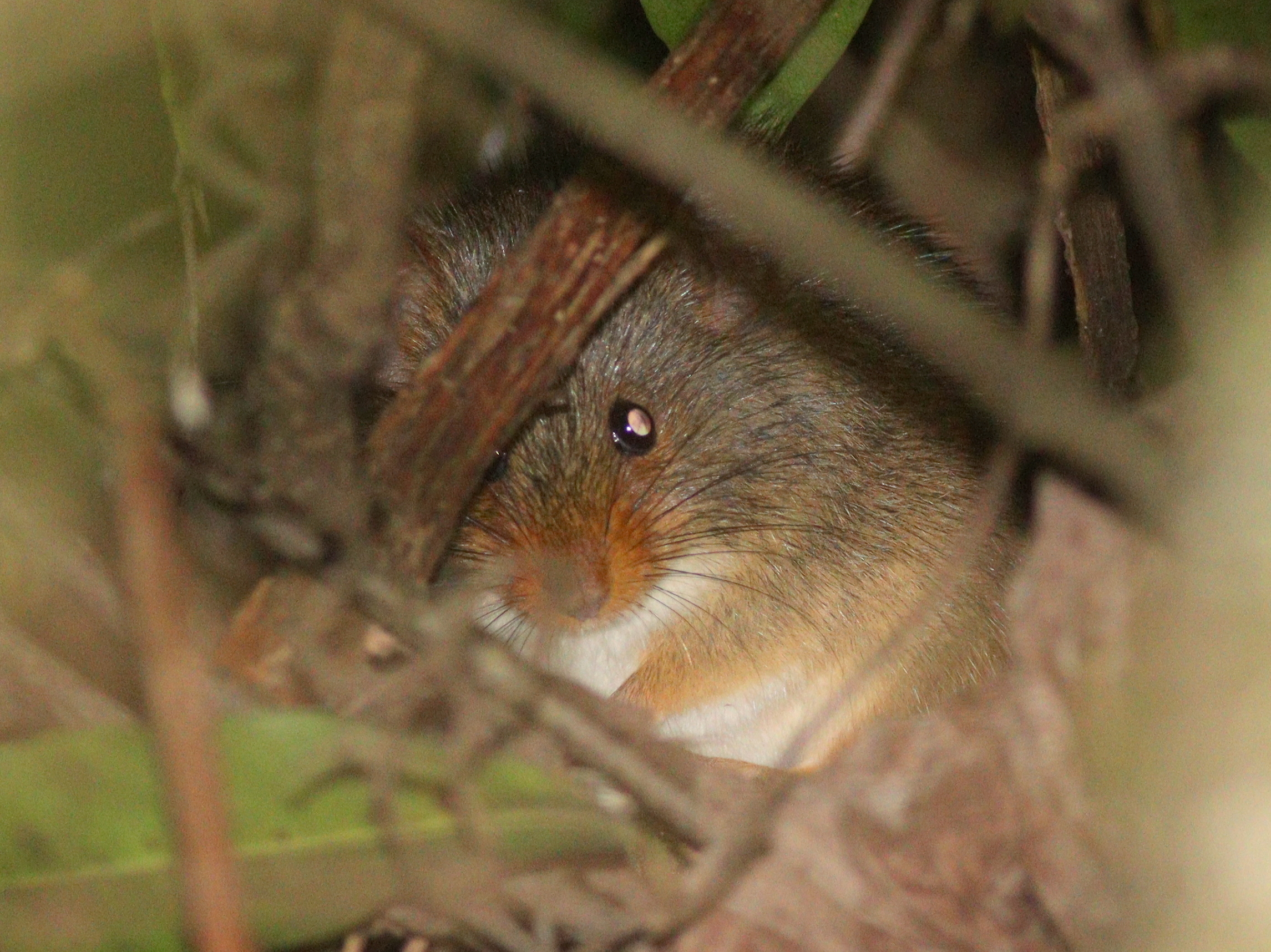
- Oenomys hypoxanthus

Scientific classification
- Kingdom: Animalia
- Phylum: Chordata
- Class: Mammalia
- Order: Rodentia
- Family: Muridae
- Tribe: Arvicanthini
- Genus: Oenomys; Thomas, 1904

Type species
- Mus hypoxanthus

Species
- See text

= Oenomys =

Oenomys Temporal range: Late Pliocene to Recent

Genus of rodents

Oenomys is a genus of African rodents known as rufous-nosed rats. They occur from south-east Guinea and Ghana through the Congo forest to Uganda and Kenya. The nose is reddish, or at least the cheeks, which suggested both the English and scientific names (oeno- means "wine" and -mys denotes a mouselike animal in Greek).

The two recognised, living species occupy separate geographical ranges:

- Oenomys hypoxanthus (Pucheran, 1855), common rufous-nosed rat
  - Oenomys hypoxanthus albiventris (Eisentraut, 1968), a montane subspecies
- Oenomys ornatus (Thomas, 1911), Ghana rufous-nosed rat
- †Oenomys tiercelini
