= Greater hamster-rat =

Conservation status
- Near Threatened (IUCN 3.1)

Scientific classification
- Kingdom: Animalia
- Phylum: Chordata
- Class: Mammalia
- Order: Rodentia
- Family: Nesomyidae
- Genus: Beamys
- Species: B. major

Binomial name
- Beamys major Dollman, 1914

Species of rodent

The greater hamster-rat, greater long-tailed pouched rat, or long-tailed pouched rat (Beamys major) is a species of rodent in the family Nesomyidae. It is found in Malawi, Tanzania, and Zambia. Its natural habitats are subtropical or tropical moist lowland forest and subtropical or tropical moist montane forest. It is threatened by habitat loss.

== Sources ==
- Howell, K., Oguge, N. & Chitaukali, W. 2004. Beamys major. 2006 IUCN Red List of Threatened Species. Downloaded on 19 July 2007.
- Musser, G. G.; Carleton, M. D. (2005). "Superfamily Muroidea". In Wilson, D. E.; Reeder, D. M. (eds.). Mammal Species of the World: A Taxonomic and Geographic Reference (3rd ed.). Johns Hopkins University Press. pp. 894–1531. ISBN 978-0-8018-8221-0. OCLC 62265494.
