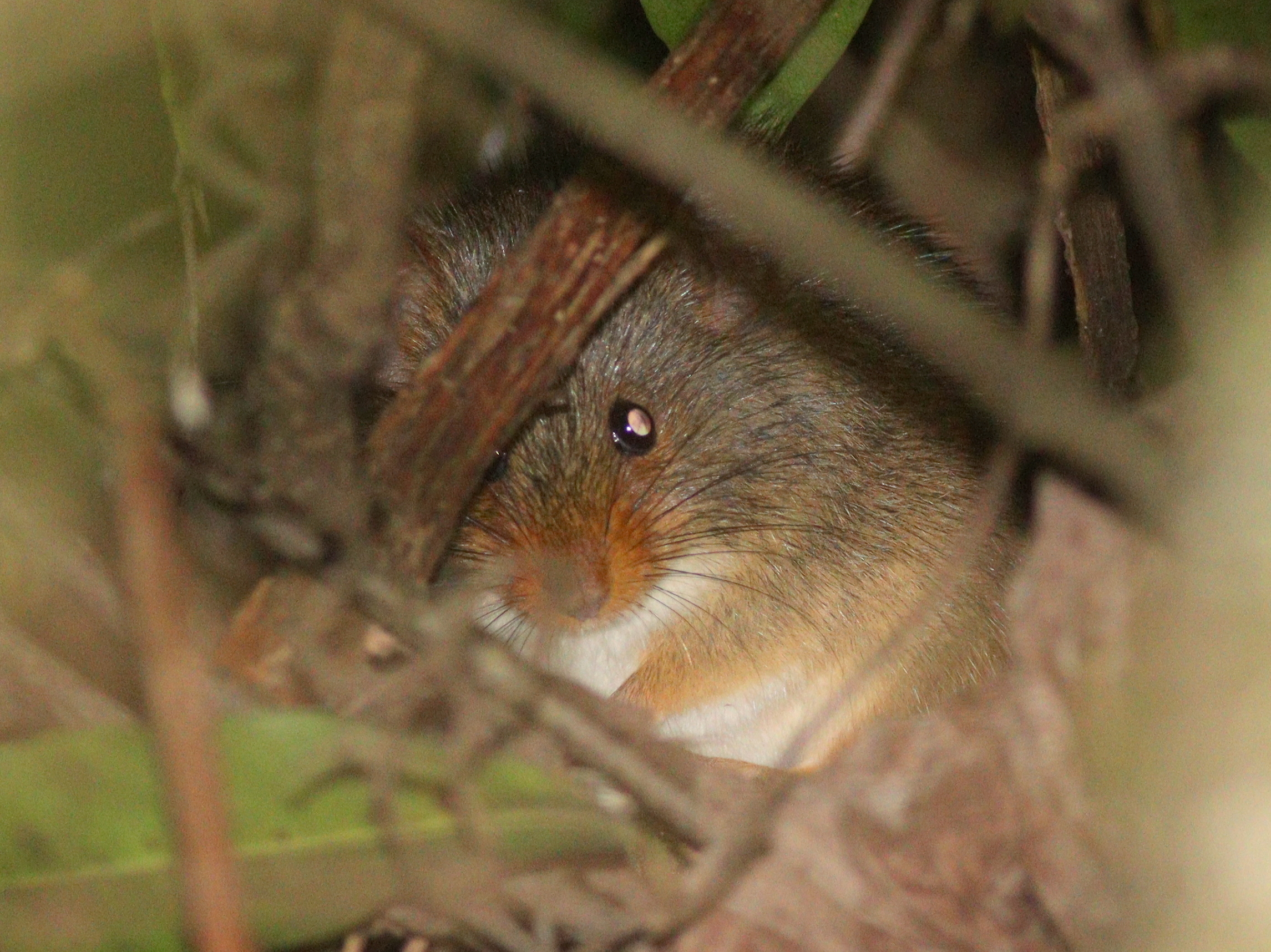

Conservation status
- Least Concern (IUCN 3.1)

Scientific classification
- Kingdom: Animalia
- Phylum: Chordata
- Class: Mammalia
- Order: Rodentia
- Family: Muridae
- Genus: Oenomys
- Species: O. hypoxanthus

Binomial name
- Oenomys hypoxanthus (Pucheran, 1855)

= Common rufous-nosed rat =

Species of rodent

The common rufous-nosed rat (Oenomys hypoxanthus) is a species of rodent in the family Muridae. It is found in Angola, Burundi, Cameroon, Central African Republic, Republic of the Congo, Democratic Republic of the Congo, Equatorial Guinea, Ethiopia, Gabon, Kenya, Nigeria, Rwanda, South Sudan, Tanzania, and Uganda. Its natural habitats are subtropical or tropical seasonally wet or flooded lowland grassland and seasonally flooded agricultural land. It is commonly sighted in the June & July months but observations have been seen throughout the year.
