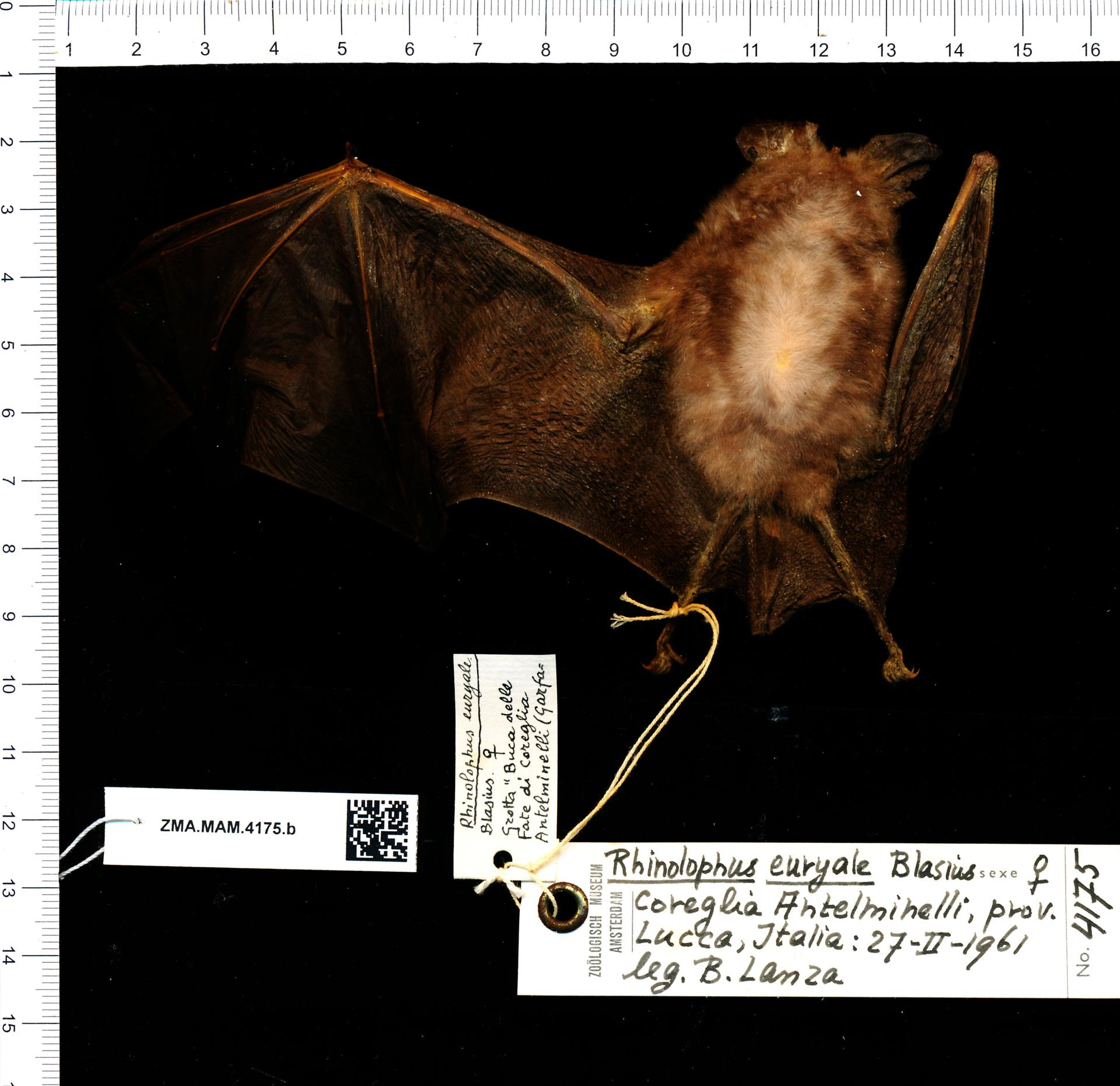

Conservation status
- Near Threatened (IUCN 3.1)

Scientific classification
- Kingdom: Animalia
- Phylum: Chordata
- Class: Mammalia
- Infraclass: Placentalia
- Order: Chiroptera
- Family: Rhinolophidae
- Genus: Rhinolophus
- Species: R. deckenii

Binomial name
- Rhinolophus deckenii Peters, 1867
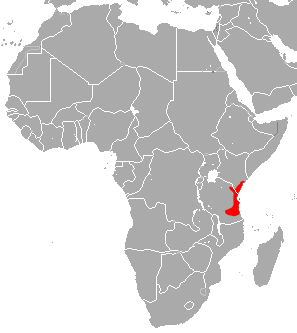
- Decken's horseshoe bat range

= Decken's horseshoe bat =

Species of bat

Decken's horseshoe bat (Rhinolophus deckenii) is a species of horseshoe bat. It is found in Kenya and Tanzania. Its natural habitats are tropical and subtropical moist lowland and montane forest, moist savanna, caves and other subterranean habitats.

== Taxonomy ==
Decken's horseshoe bat was described as a new species in 1867 by German naturalist Wilhelm Peters. The holotype had been collected in Tanzania. The eponym of the species name "deckenii " is Karl Klaus von der Decken, a German baron and explorer of eastern Africa; Decken collected the specimen that Peters used to describe the species. At times, it has been treated as a subspecies of Geoffroy's horseshoe bat (R. clivosus).

== Description ==
Decken's horseshoe bat is considered medium-sized for an African horseshoe bat. It has a forearm length of 48–56 mm (1.9–2.2 in), and individuals weigh approximately 15 g (0.53 oz). It can be differentiated from other horseshoe bats in East Africa by the width of the "horseshoe" of its nose-leaf, which is between 9–11 mm (0.35–0.43 in). Additionally, the greatest length of its skull is more than 22 mm (0.87 in), while that of Darling's horseshoe bat is less than 21 mm (0.83 in).

== Range and habitat ==
Decken's horseshoe bat is found only in East Africa, where it has been documented in Kenya and Tanzania. Little is known about its habitat preferences, but it is associated with forested land.

== Conservation ==
As of 2008, it is evaluated as a near-threatened species by the IUCN. Threats that it faces included habitat destruction due to deforestation for agricultural clearing, as well as logging. The species is likely experiencing a significant population decline, and is close to qualifying for the vulnerable designation.
