= Montane shaggy rat =

Conservation status
- Endangered (IUCN 3.1)

Scientific classification
- Kingdom: Animalia
- Phylum: Chordata
- Class: Mammalia
- Infraclass: Placentalia
- Order: Rodentia
- Family: Muridae
- Genus: Dasymys
- Species: D. montanus

Binomial name
- Dasymys montanus Thomas, 1906
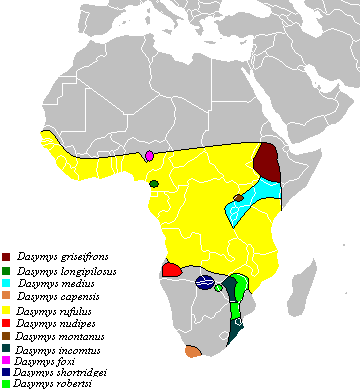
- Distribution of Dasymys species. Dasymys montanus is shown in brown.

Species of rodent

The montane shaggy rat (Dasymys montanus) is a species of rodent in the family Muridae. It is found in Uganda and possibly Democratic Republic of the Congo. Its natural habitats are subtropical or tropical moist montane forest, subtropical or tropical high-altitude grassland, and swampland. It is threatened by habitat loss. In terms of appearance it is of moderate size compared to others in its genus Dasymys, with dark grey long, fine, hair. It has a fairly short tail compared to its size (roughly 70% of its body's size).

== Additional references ==
- Musser, G. G.; Carleton, M. D. (2005). "Superfamily Muroidea". In Wilson, D. E.; Reeder, D. M. (eds.). Mammal Species of the World: A Taxonomic and Geographic Reference (3rd ed.). Johns Hopkins University Press. p. 1317. ISBN 978-0-8018-8221-0. OCLC 62265494.
