= Robert's shaggy rat =

Scientific classification
- Kingdom: Animalia
- Phylum: Chordata
- Class: Mammalia
- Order: Rodentia
- Family: Muridae
- Genus: Dasymys
- Species: D. robertsii

Binomial name
- Dasymys robertsii Mullin, Taylor & Pillay, 2004

Species of rodent

Robert's shaggy rat (Dasymys robertsii) is a species of rodent in the genus Dasymys that lives in South Africa. It was described in 2004.
