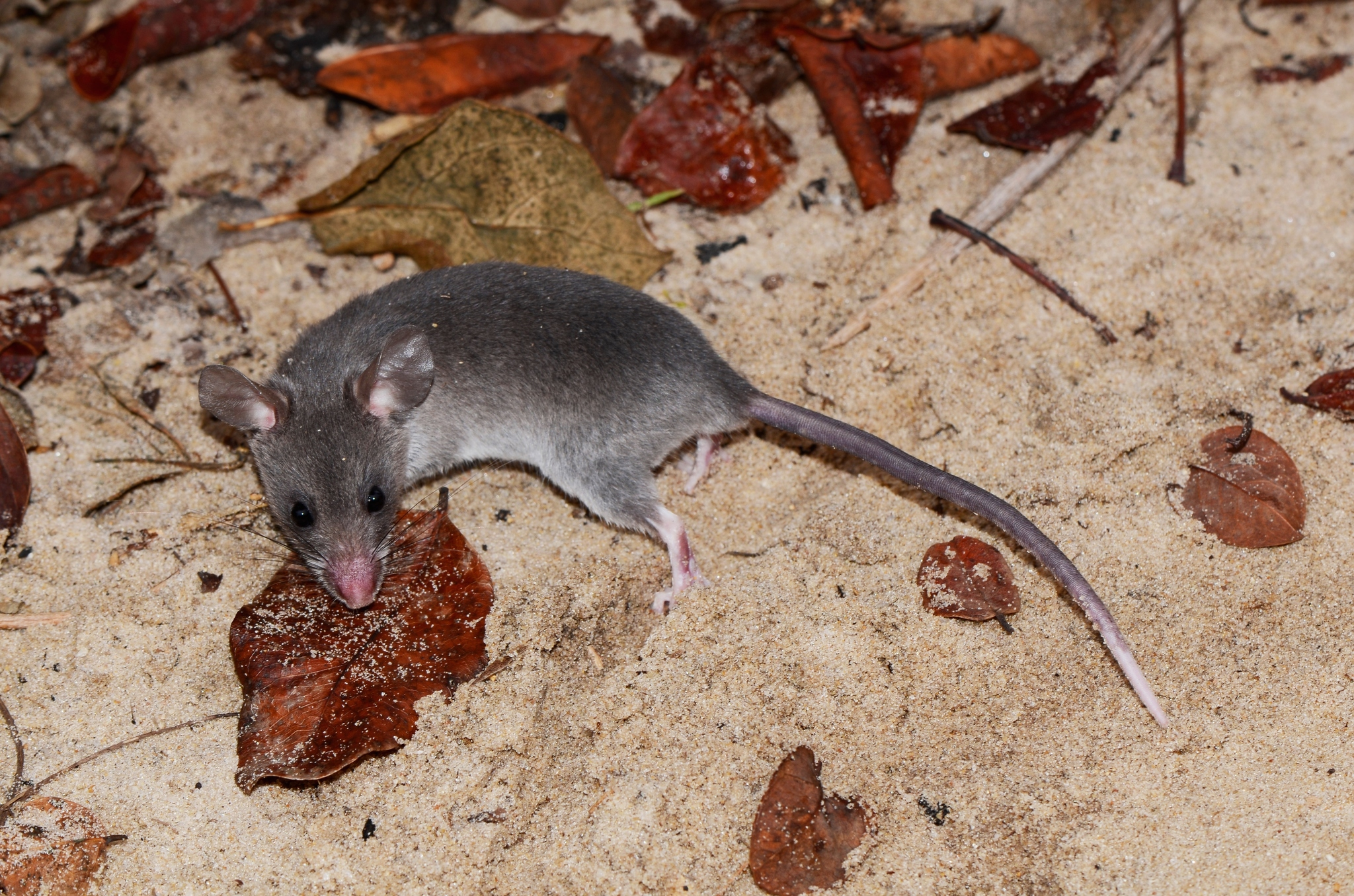

Conservation status
- Least Concern (IUCN 3.1)

Scientific classification
- Domain: Eukaryota
- Kingdom: Animalia
- Phylum: Chordata
- Class: Mammalia
- Order: Rodentia
- Family: Nesomyidae
- Genus: Beamys
- Species: B. hindei

Binomial name
- Beamys hindei Thomas, 1909

= Lesser hamster-rat =

Species of rodent

The lesser hamster-rat or long-tailed pouched rat (Beamys hindei) is a species of rodent in the family Nesomyidae. It is found in Kenya and Tanzania. Its natural habitat is subtropical or tropical moist lowland coastal forests. It is threatened by habitat loss. Oldfield Thomas named it in honor of Sidney Langford Hinde, a British officer and recreational naturalist.
