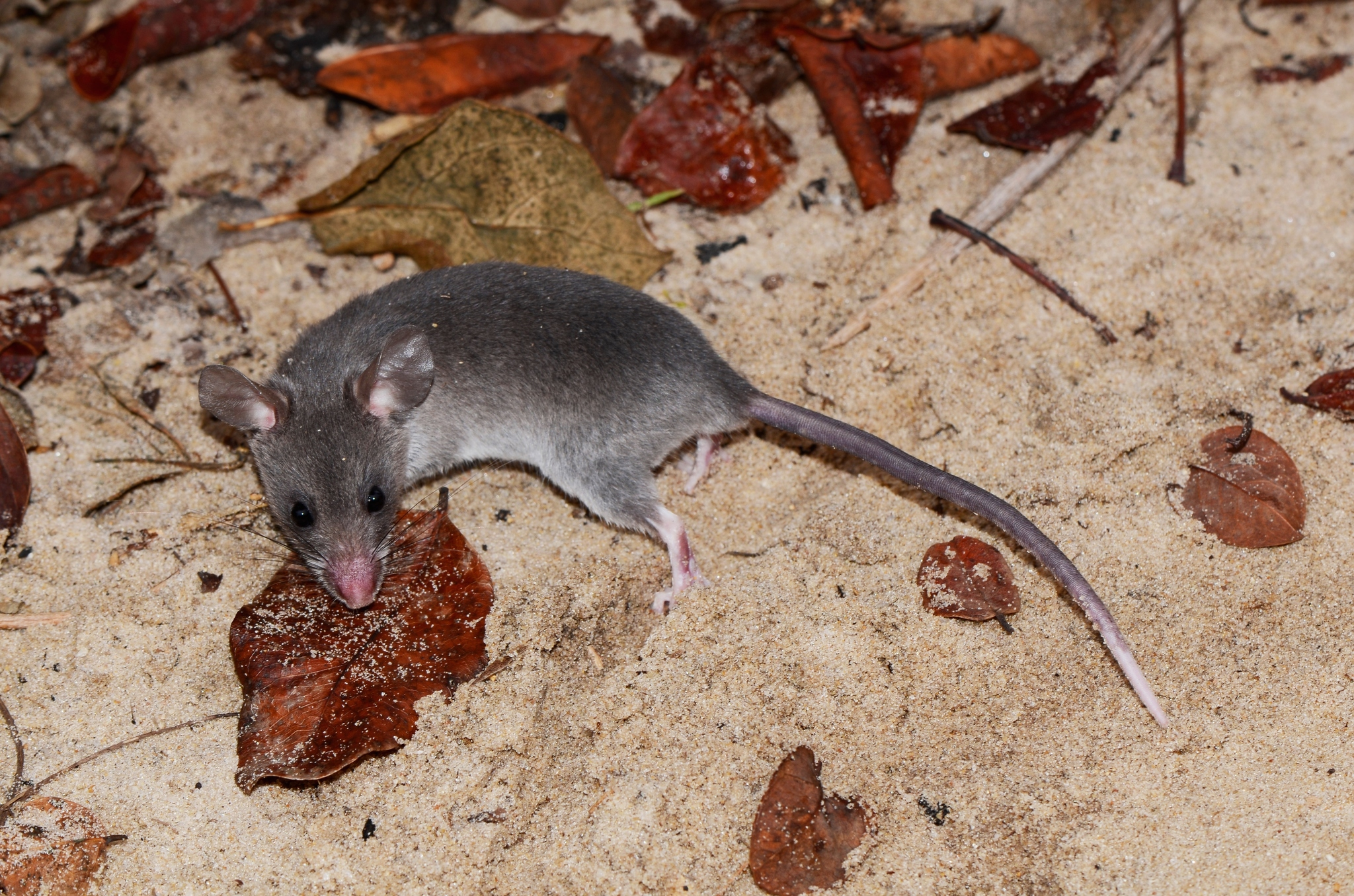
- Beamys hindei

Scientific classification
- Domain: Eukaryota
- Kingdom: Animalia
- Phylum: Chordata
- Class: Mammalia
- Order: Rodentia
- Family: Nesomyidae
- Subfamily: Cricetomyinae
- Genus: Beamys; Thomas, 1909

Species
- Beamys hindei Beamys major

= Beamys =

Genus of rodents

Beamys is a genus of rodent in the family Nesomyidae. It contains the following species:

- Lesser hamster-rat (Beamys hindei)
- Greater hamster-rat (Beamys major)
