= Rwandan shaggy rat =

Scientific classification
- Kingdom: Animalia
- Phylum: Chordata
- Class: Mammalia
- Order: Rodentia
- Family: Muridae
- Genus: Dasymys
- Species: D. rwandae

Binomial name
- Dasymys rwandae W. Verheyen, Hulselmans, Dierckx, Colyn, Leirs, E. Verheyen, 2003

Species of rodent

The Rwandan shaggy rat (Dasymys rwandae) is a species of shaggy marsh rat endemic to north-western Rwanda, close to the Virunga Mountains.

== See also ==
- List of mammals of Rwanda
