= Dasymys =

Dasymys Temporal range: Late Pliocene to Recent

Scientific classification
- Kingdom: Animalia
- Phylum: Chordata
- Class: Mammalia
- Infraclass: Placentalia
- Order: Rodentia
- Family: Muridae
- Tribe: Arvicanthini
- Genus: Dasymys; Peters, 1875

Type species
- Dasymys gueinzii

Species
- about 11, see text
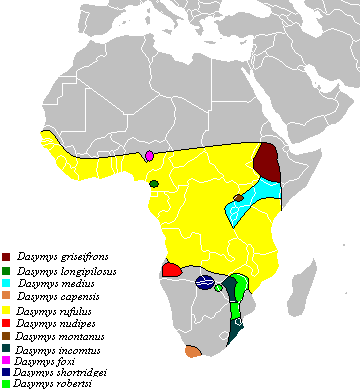
- Distribution of Dasymys species.

Genus of rodents

Dasymys is a genus of semiaquatic rodents in the subfamily Murinae, the Old World rats and mice. The genus is endemic to Africa.

These rats are wetland habitat specialists, occurring in marshy areas with wet ground and thick vegetation, such as swamps and vleis. They swim well. They are nocturnal and solitary. Species are more common in the northern regions of Sub-Saharan Africa, likely because their wetland habitat is more degraded in southern regions.

The genus is not well studied and its taxonomy is not clear. The number of species and their relationships have only been tentatively determined.

Species include:

- Dasymys alleni – Glover Allen's dasymys
- Dasymys cabrali – Crawford-Cabral's dasymys
- Dasymys foxi – Fox's shaggy rat
- Dasymys incomtus – African marsh rat
- Dasymys montanus – Montane shaggy rat
- Dasymys nudipes – Angolan marsh rat
- Dasymys robertsii - Robert's shaggy rat
- Dasymys rufulus – West African shaggy rat
- Dasymys rwandae – Rwandan dasymys
- Dasymys shortridgei
- Dasymys sua – Tanzanian dasymys
