= African marsh rat =

Conservation status
- Least Concern (IUCN 3.1)

Scientific classification
- Kingdom: Animalia
- Phylum: Chordata
- Class: Mammalia
- Order: Rodentia
- Family: Muridae
- Genus: Dasymys
- Species: D. incomtus

Binomial name
- Dasymys incomtus (Sundevall, 1847)

Synonyms
- Dasymys alleni Lawrence & Loveridge, 1953; Dasymys cabrali W. Verheyen, Hulselmans, Dierckx, Colyn, Leirs & E. Verheyen, 2003; Dasymys rwandae W. Verheyen, Hulselmans, Dierckx, Colyn, Leirs & E. Verheyen, 2003; Dasymys sua W. Verheyen, Hulselmans, Dierckx, Colyn, Leirs & E. Verheyen, 2003

Species of rodent

The African marsh rat or common dasymys (Dasymys incomtus) is a species of rodent in the family Muridae. It is found in Angola, Democratic Republic of the Congo, Ethiopia, Kenya, Malawi, South Africa, South Sudan, Tanzania, Uganda, Zambia, and Zimbabwe. Its natural habitats are moist savanna, temperate grassland, subtropical or tropical seasonally wet or flooded lowland grassland, and swamps.
