= Tanzanian woolly bat =

Conservation status
- Endangered (IUCN 3.1)

Scientific classification
- Kingdom: Animalia
- Phylum: Chordata
- Class: Mammalia
- Order: Chiroptera
- Family: Vespertilionidae
- Genus: Kerivoula
- Species: K. africana

Binomial name
- Kerivoula africana Dobson, 1878

Species of bat

The Tanzanian woolly bat or Dobson's painted bata (Kerivoula africana) is a species of vesper bat in the family Vespertilionidae. It is found only in Tanzania. Locally, it is known as the "popo" or "tunge".

== Taxonomy and etymology ==
It was initially described by Irish zoologist George Edward Dobson in 1878. He described the species based on a specimen collected by French zoologist Achille Raffray in 1875 in Zanzibar. Its species name "africana" is a Neo-Latin derivative of Latin āfricānus, meaning "African".

== Description ==
In his 1878 description of the species, Dobson stated that its ears and tragus were similar in appearance to that of Hardwicke's woolly bat, Kerivoula hardwicki. It lacks fur between its eyes, but has a fringe of longer hairs along its lips. Its dorsal fur is bicolored, with the base of individual hairs dark brown and the tip grayish brown. Fur on the ventral surface is also bicolored, but the color is lighter overall. Its head and body is 1.35 in (34 mm) long; its tail is also 1.35 in (34 mm) long; its ear is 0.5 in (13 mm) long; its tragus is 0.3 in (7.6 mm) long; its forearm is 1.1 in (28 mm) long; its foot is 0.25 in (6.4 mm) long. Its dental formula is 2.1.3.33.1.3.3 for a total of 38 teeth. At the time of its description, it was the smallest species of its genus known.

== Range and habitat ==
It is endemic to Tanzania, and is only found on the country's eastern coast. Its natural habitat is subtropical or tropical moist lowland forests. It is threatened by habitat loss. Coastal wetlands are lost via conversion to subsistence agriculture and coastal forests being subject to logging by the timber industry and local use.

== Conservation ==
It is currently evaluated as endangered by the IUCN, a designation it has maintained since 2004. From 1988 to 1996, it was evaluated as possibly extinct, and from 1996 to 2004 it was evaluated as data deficient. It meets the criteria to be listed as an endangered species because its area of occupancy is likely less than 500 km^{2} (190 mi^{2}), all individuals are likely in fewer than five locations, and the extent of its habitat is in decline. In 1999, MacPhee and Flemming considered it allegedly extinct since roughly 1878, though it was rediscovered shortly after their paper was published, in 2000. In addition to habitat destruction, this species is also threatened by collection for use in traditional medicine. The Sukuma people believe that pneumonia can be treated by burning the body of a Tanzanian woolly bat and inhaling the smoke. One bat is supposed to be burned and inhaled per day for three days.
