= Crocidura phanluongi =

Conservation status
- Least Concern (IUCN 3.1)

Scientific classification
- Kingdom: Animalia
- Phylum: Chordata
- Class: Mammalia
- Order: Eulipotyphla
- Family: Soricidae
- Genus: Crocidura
- Species: C. phanluongi

Binomial name
- Crocidura phanluongi Jenkins, Abramov, Rozhnov, & Olsson, 2010
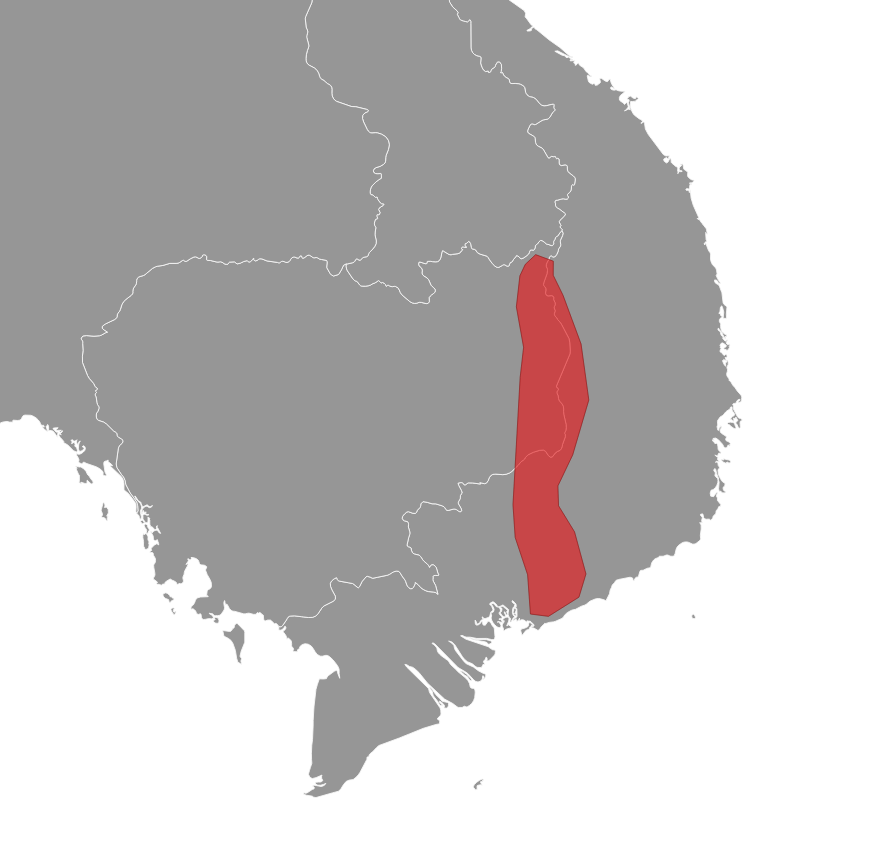

Species of mammal

Crocidura phanluongi is a species of shrew in the genus Crocidura from southern Vietnam and nearby Cambodia. It is a somewhat small, gray shrew with an ecologically diverse distribution.

== Taxonomy ==
Crocidura phanluongi was first collected in 2006 in Virachey National Park of northeastern Cambodia and subsequently, in 2007, in three localities in southern Vietnam. In total, six specimens are known from Cambodia and seven from Vietnam. In 2010, Paulina Jenkins and coworkers described it as a new species of Crocidura, with the type locality at Yok Đôn National Park, Đắk Lắk Province, Vietnam. The description appeared in Zootaxa on January 27, 2010. Six other new species of Crocidura have been described from Vietnam since 2004. (Note: The other new species are Crocidura kegoensis Lunde et al., 2004; Crocidura sokolovi Jenkins et al., 2007; Crocidura zaitsevi Jenkins et al., 2007; Crocidura phuquocensis Abramov et al., 2008; Crocidura guy Jenkins et al., 2009; and Crocidura annamitensis Jenkins et al., 2009.) The specific name, phanluongi, honors Vietnamese biologist Phan Luong, who participated in the survey that resulted in the discovery of C. phanluongi.

== Description ==
Crocidura phanluongi is a small to medium-sized shrew with a relatively long tail. The fur is dark gray above and somewhat paler below. The upper surfaces of the feet are even paler. Cambodian specimens are gray brown above and silver-gray below. There are also some slight morphometrical variations among the known specimens. The head and body length is 54 to 66 mm (2.1 to 2.6 in), averaging 59.6 mm (2.35 in); tail length is 40 to 48 mm (1.6 to 1.9 in), averaging 44.4 mm (1.75 in); the hindfoot length is 10 to 12 mm (0.39 to 0.47 in), averaging 11.7 mm (0.46 in); and the condylobasal length (a measure of skull length) is 16.8 to 18.1 mm (0.66 to 0.71 in), averaging 17.4 mm (0.69 in). In the skull, the interorbital region is narrow. The upper third molar is slender and the talonid of the lower third molar is reduced.

== Ecology and behavior ==
Crocidura phanluongi has a relatively broad distribution, extending through at least three ecoregions—southeastern Indochina dry evergreen forests, central Indochina dry forests, and southern Vietnam lowland dry forests. All specimens were caught in forest.

== Literature cited ==
- Jenkins, P. D., Lunde, D. P. and Moncrieff, C. B. 2009. Descriptions of new species of Crocidura (Soricomorpha: Soricidae) from mainland Southeast Asia, with synopses of previously described species and remarks on biogeography. Bulletin of the American Museum of Natural History 331:356–405.
- Jenkins, P. D., Abramov, A. V., Rozhnov, V. V. and Olsson, A. 2010. A new species of Crocidura (Soricomorpha: Soricidae) from southern Vietnam and north-eastern Cambodia (abstract only). Zootaxa 2345:60–68.
