= Indochinese shrew =

Conservation status
- Least Concern (IUCN 3.1)

Scientific classification
- Kingdom: Animalia
- Phylum: Chordata
- Class: Mammalia
- Order: Eulipotyphla
- Family: Soricidae
- Genus: Crocidura
- Species: C. indochinensis

Binomial name
- Crocidura indochinensis Robinson and Kloss, 1922
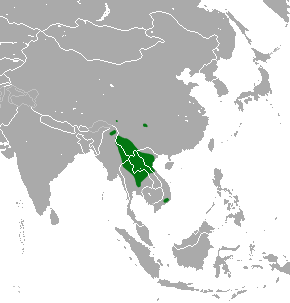
- Range of the Indochinese shrew, derived from the IUCN Red List

Species of mammal

The Indochinese shrew (Crocidura indochinensis) is a species of white-toothed shrew native to Southeast Asia. It was first identified in 1922 by Herbert C. Robinson and C. Boden Kloss. The species is often taxonomized as a subspecies Horsfield's shrew, but bears a different range, occurring in Myanmar, Vietnam, and the Yunnan province of China.

== Description ==
C. indochinensis is on the smaller end of shrews, with dark brownish gray fur and a long, slender tail. No specific data is available for body weight. However, it has a slender tail and an intermediate size between the larger Voracious shrew (Crocidura vorax) and smaller Chinese white-toothed shrew (Crocidura rapax).
