= Ivory Coast white-toothed shrew =

Conservation status
- Least Concern (IUCN 3.1)

Scientific classification
- Kingdom: Animalia
- Phylum: Chordata
- Class: Mammalia
- Order: Eulipotyphla
- Family: Soricidae
- Genus: Crocidura
- Species: C. eburnea

Binomial name
- Crocidura eburnea Heim de Balsac, 1958

Synonyms
- Crocidura bottegi eburnea

Species of mammal

The Ivory Coast white-toothed shrew (Crocidura eburnea) is a species of mammal in the family Soricidae. It is native to the Ivory Coast, Liberia, and Guinea.

== Taxonomy ==
Initially described in 1958 by Henri Heim de Balsac as a subspecies of Bottego's shrew (C. bottegi), it was synonymized with the West African pygmy shrew (C. obscurior) in 2005. A 2014 morphological and genetic study found it to be a distinct species as a sister species to C. obscurior. This has been followed by the American Society of Mammalogists and the IUCN Red List.

It can only be distinguished from obscurior by its skull shape and mtDNA nucleotide sequence. Both species are sympatric with one another in southeastern Guinea, eastern Liberia, and southwestern Ivory Coast.

== Distribution and habitat ==
It is found in lowland rainforest in southeastern Guinea, eastern Liberia, and southwestern Ivory Coast. It is thought to inhabit lowland rainforest (western and eastern Guinean lowland forests), but little is known of its ecology.

== Status ==
This species is not thought to face any major threats, and is thus classified as Least Concern on the IUCN Red List. Some populations may however be at risk from logging or land clearance for agriculture. C. obscurior is thought to be more adaptable to anthropogenic habitats than C. eburnea.
