= Javan hidden shrew =

Conservation status
- Data Deficient (IUCN 3.1)

Scientific classification
- Kingdom: Animalia
- Phylum: Chordata
- Class: Mammalia
- Order: Eulipotyphla
- Family: Soricidae
- Genus: Crocidura
- Species: C. abscondita

Binomial name
- Crocidura abscondita Esselstyn, Achmadi, & Maharadatunkamsi, 2014

Synonyms
- Crocidura absconditus

Species of mammal

The Javan hidden shrew or Javan long-tailed shrew (Crocidura abscondita, also erroneously referred to as Crocidura absconditus) is a species of mammal in the family Soricidae. It is endemic to the island of Java in Indonesia.

== Taxonomy ==
It was described in 2014 based on its morphological distinctiveness, with phylogenetic analysis also supporting it as being a distinct species. Phylogenetic analysis indicates that it is a sister species to the Sumatran long-tailed shrew (C. paradoxura), from which it diverged during the Miocene, about 9.5 million years ago.

The specific name, abscondita, means 'hidden' in Latin and is a reference to the undescribed ("hidden") mammal species of Southeast Asia. The authors who described the species originally used the spelling "absconditus", but the ending of the specific name has been amended to agree with the grammatical gender of the genus name.

== Distribution and habitat ==
It is endemic to the Mount Gede-Pangrango area, a double-peak stratovolcano located in West Java, Indonesia. It is thought to inhabit montane and subalpine forests.

== Description ==
It is a species of Crocidura of medium size, with a total length of 161.8 ± 4.11 mm, a tail of 88.3 ± 3.5 mm and a weight of 7.5 ± 0.87 g. Its pelage is gray at the base of hairs, with brown tips on the back and gray tips on the belly.

== Status ==
It may be threatened by habitat loss, which has been extensive throughout Java, but little is known of this species' life history or habitat preference. It is thus classified as Data Deficient on the IUCN Red List.
