= Egyptian pygmy shrew =

Conservation status
- Data Deficient (IUCN 3.1)

Scientific classification
- Kingdom: Animalia
- Phylum: Chordata
- Class: Mammalia
- Order: Eulipotyphla
- Family: Soricidae
- Genus: Crocidura
- Species: C. religiosa

Binomial name
- Crocidura religiosa (I. Geoffroy, 1827)
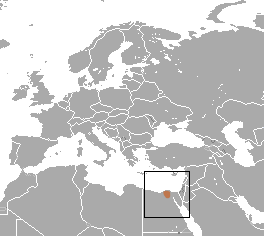
- Egyptian pygmy shrew range

Species of mammal

The Egyptian pygmy shrew or sacred shrew (Crocidura religiosa) is a species of mammal in the family Soricidae. It is endemic to Egypt. Its natural habitat is arable land. It is threatened by habitat loss, partially caused by the construction of the Aswan Dam. They are 48–62 mm (1.9–2.4 in) in length and weigh 7 g (0.25 oz), making them one of the smallest shrews in Egypt.

== Breeding ==
Like most shrews, it is a nocturnal animal, hiding during day in burrows and crevices. Its diet is mostly insectivorous. It is solitary and territorial. Female pygmy shrews give birth to litters of one to ten, hairless young with closed eyes. Their eyes open at 13 days and they are weaned at 20 days. The young reach sexual maturity at two to three months and live for 12 to 18 months.

== Description ==
The Egyptian pygmy shrew has grey fur, tinged with brown on the upperparts and tipped with white on the paler underparts. The bristly tail is grey on top and white underneath and the feet are pale and almost hairless. It has small eyes, a pointed snout and a slightly flattened head which, along with its paler overall colour and proportionately longer tail, distinguishes it from other shrews found in Egypt.

== Taxonomy ==
The Egyptian pygmy shrew gained its scientific name, religiosa from the mummified specimens found in ancient Egyptian tombs in Thebes. The species has often been confused with the Somali dwarf shrew (Crocidura nana).

== History ==
According to Zahi Hawass, an Egyptian pygmy shrew was brought to the very, young Pharaoh Pepi II by Harkhouf, a governor of Aswan. The governor and Pepi II corresponded by letters; the governor let him know he'd be bringing him a shrew, the pharaoh wrote him back imploring he not let it get away. This exchange is said to have occurred in the Sixth Dynasty.
