= Fingui white-toothed shrew =

Conservation status
- Data Deficient (IUCN 3.1)

Scientific classification
- Kingdom: Animalia
- Phylum: Chordata
- Class: Mammalia
- Order: Eulipotyphla
- Family: Soricidae
- Genus: Crocidura
- Species: C. fingui

Binomial name
- Crocidura fingui Ceríaco et al., 2015

Species of mammal

The Fingui white-toothed shrew or Principe white-toothed shrew (Crocidura fingui) is a species of mammal in the family Soricidae. It is endemic to the island of Príncipe in São Tomé and Príncipe.

== Taxonomy ==
Previously thought to be an insular population of Fraser's musk shrew (C. poensis), a species common throughout much of mainland West-Central Africa, a 2015 morphological and phylogenetic analysis found it to be a distinct (although closely related) species, and described it as such. It is one of two Crocidura species endemic to the islands of São Tomé and Príncipe, the other being the São Tomé shrew (C. thomensis).

The specific epithet, fingui, is the name of this species in Principense Creole, a local language.

== Description ==
It has a head-to-rump length of 75.3–107.2 millimetres (2.96–4.22 in) and a tail between 49% and 70% of the body length. Both the pelage and skin are dark in coloration.

== Status ==
Little is known about this species, and it is thus classified as Data Deficient on the IUCN Red List. However, it may face a significant threat by predation from feral cats (Felis catus), as with C. thomensis.
