= Desert musk shrew =

Conservation status
- Least Concern (IUCN 3.1)

Scientific classification
- Kingdom: Animalia
- Phylum: Chordata
- Class: Mammalia
- Order: Eulipotyphla
- Family: Soricidae
- Genus: Crocidura
- Species: C. smithii

Binomial name
- Crocidura smithii Thomas, 1895
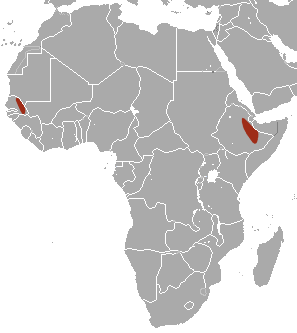
- Desert musk shrew range

Synonyms
- C. debalsaci

Species of mammal

The desert musk shrew (Crocidura smithii) is a species of mammal in the family Soricidae. It is found in Ethiopia, Senegal, and possibly Somalia. Its natural habitat is dry savanna. First described in 1895 by Oldfield Thomas, it was named after the 19th-century American explorer of Eastern Africa, Arthur Donaldson Smith, who collected the type specimen.

== Distribution and habitat ==
C. smithii is found in two distinct populations in Senegal and Ethiopia, on opposite ends of the continent. The Senegalese population was identified in 1981 by Rainer Hutterer, who originally described it as the subspecies Crocidura smithii debalascai based on its larger size than the Ethiopian population. C. s. debalascai is now considered a synonym of C. smithii. A specimen from Somalia, reported by Henri Heim de Balsac in 1966, is now considered to be Crocidura macarthuri, but C. smithii may occur in Somalia since there exists similar habitat in the country to that known to be inhabited by this species. Due to the distance between the Ethiopian and Senegalese populations, Hutterer has argued that they represent different species.

It is listed as a species of least concern by the IUCN due to the wide distribution, lack of threats to its habitat, and an assumed large population, but there is very limited information on its habitat and population size.

== Description ==
C. smithii is a small to medium sized shrew (whole body length between 64 millimetres (2.5 in) and 85 millimetres (3.3 in)) with a white tail slightly over half its body length. It has slate-grey to pale yellowish-brown fur on the back of the body, with a white underbelly which reaches almost to the tops of the ears and cheeks. The feet are also white, with short hind limbs. The ears are short and hairless. Thomas described it as having a "curiously youthful" appearance even as an adult.
