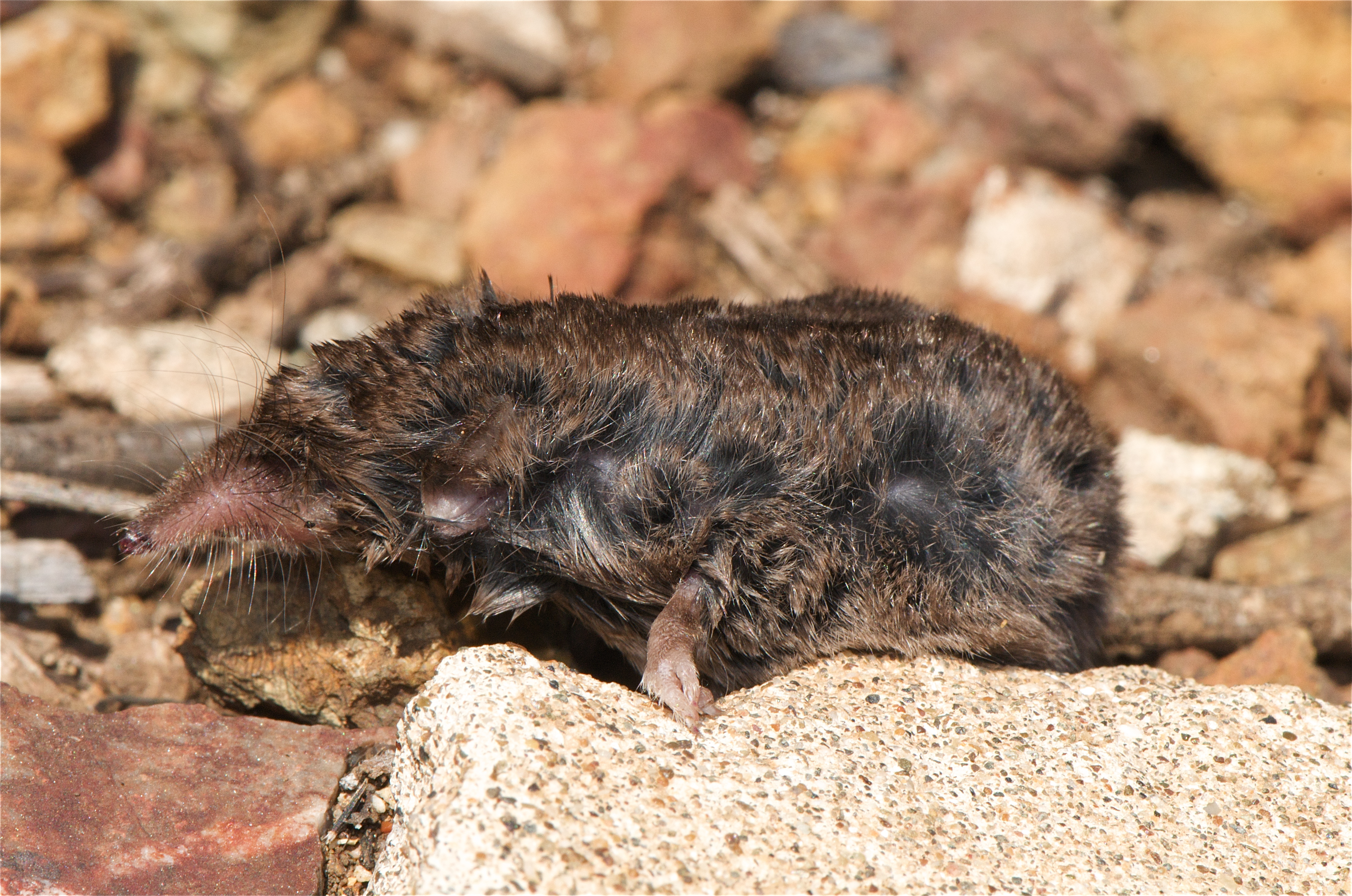

Conservation status
- Least Concern (IUCN 3.1)

Scientific classification
- Kingdom: Animalia
- Phylum: Chordata
- Class: Mammalia
- Order: Eulipotyphla
- Family: Soricidae
- Genus: Crocidura
- Species: C. vorax

Binomial name
- Crocidura vorax Allen, 1923
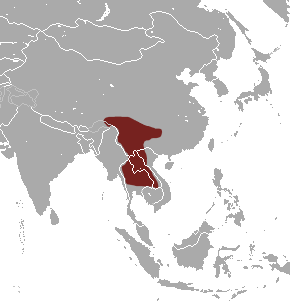
- Voracious shrew range

= Voracious shrew =

Species of mammal

The voracious shrew (Crocidura vorax) is a common and widespread species of shrew native to China, India, Laos, Thailand, and Vietnam.

== Description ==
It is larger than the Indochinese shrew Crocidura indochinensis and the Chinese white-toothed shrew Crocidura rapax.
