= Luzon shrew =

Conservation status
- Least Concern (IUCN 3.1)

Scientific classification
- Kingdom: Animalia
- Phylum: Chordata
- Class: Mammalia
- Order: Eulipotyphla
- Family: Soricidae
- Genus: Crocidura
- Species: C. grayi

Binomial name
- Crocidura grayi Dobson, 1890
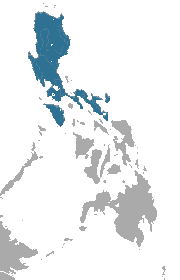
- Luzon shrew range

Species of mammal

The Luzon shrew (Crocidura grayi) is a species of white-toothed shrew endemic to the Philippines, where it is found in forested areas in the north of the country. It is typically found in places of cover. The species is common and its risk of extinction is low.

== Description ==
Crocidura grayi is a small mammal which is active both day and night. It is attracted to earthworm bait. It was first described by George Edward Dobson in 1890. The weight of an adult Luzon shrew is approximately ten grams. It is closely related to Crocidura beatus, which shares similar patterns of elevational range and abundance on Leyte. It is thought, from surgical evidence, to eat both insects and amphipods. Average litter size is 1.2 ± 0.2.

== Distribution and habitat ==
Crocidura grayi is found in the Luzon and Mindoro faunal regions (including Catanduanes Island), between 250 and 2,400 meters in elevation. It lives mainly in primary lowland, montane, and mossy forests, and is less common in secondary forests. It does not appear beyond forested areas. Specimens have been found on the ground in areas of moderate to heavy cover, such as next to fallen logs, openings to tunnels, the sides of ravines, or the bases of trees.

== Ecology ==
The Luzon shrew is presumed to have a large population, and not thought to be declining quickly. It is considered to have a wide distribution and considered to be locally common. It has been listed as "Least Concern" on the IUCN Red List since assessment in 2016.

A threat to the species is deforestation, which has affected it especially in lower elevations. Forest has been lost to human settlements, agriculture, and logging. A 1999 study found did not find any evidence of predation on the species.
