= Armenian shrew =

Conservation status
- Data Deficient (IUCN 3.1)

Scientific classification
- Kingdom: Animalia
- Phylum: Chordata
- Class: Mammalia
- Infraclass: Placentalia
- Order: Eulipotyphla
- Family: Soricidae
- Genus: Crocidura
- Species: C. armenica

Binomial name
- Crocidura armenica Gureev, 1963
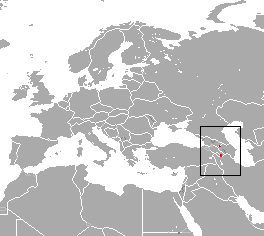
- Armenian shrew range

Species of mammal

The Armenian shrew (Crocidura armenica) is a species of mammal in the family Soricidae. It is endemic to Armenia.

== Taxonomy ==
Crocidura armenicai was named in 1963 by Gureev. It was known only from the two type specimens, both of which were damaged. It is a member of the "pergrisea" species complex, which is taxonomically controversial, and armenicai was not always considered a valid species: for instance Zitsev (1993) thought that it might be a subspecies of C. pergrisea, Hutterer (1993) and Kryštufek and Vohralík (2005) considered it a full species, while the 2018 Handbook of the Mammals of the World did not list it. A 2024 study, using micro-CT scanning and genetic data, tentatively reanalyzed Crocidura armenica as a full species, and identified several new specimens from museum collections. They found that it was relatively close genetically to Crocidura arispa, but that there was a distinct difference in the skull and mandible shape.

== Description ==
The Armenian shrew is around 60 millimetres (2.4 in) long, with a 45 millimetres (1.8 in) tail. The fur is grey, with a white stomach. It changes shades in the winter and summer. It can be distinguished by the small skull and by characteristics of the teeth.

There is minimal information on the behavior, habitat, and distribution of the Armenian shrew, which is not very well known. It was first found in Armenia and thought to be endemic, but a 2024 paper tentatively identified as the Armenian shrew several specimens found in Azerbaijan. Shrews of the "perigisea" group can be found in rocky habitats.
