= Elgon shrew =

Conservation status
- Least Concern (IUCN 3.1)

Scientific classification
- Kingdom: Animalia
- Phylum: Chordata
- Class: Mammalia
- Order: Eulipotyphla
- Family: Soricidae
- Genus: Crocidura
- Species: C. elgonius

Binomial name
- Crocidura elgonius Osgood, 1910
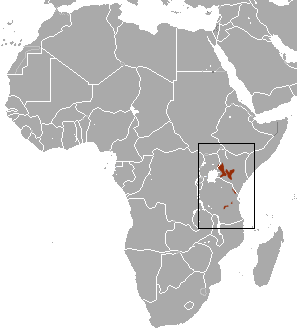
- Elgon shrew range

Species of mammal

The Elgon shrew (Crocidura elgonius) is a species of mammal in the family Soricidae. It is found in Kenya and Tanzania. Its natural habitat is subtropical or tropical moist montane forests.
