= Xanthippe's shrew =

Conservation status
- Least Concern (IUCN 3.1)

Scientific classification
- Kingdom: Animalia
- Phylum: Chordata
- Class: Mammalia
- Order: Eulipotyphla
- Family: Soricidae
- Genus: Crocidura
- Species: C. xantippe

Binomial name
- Crocidura xantippe Osgood, 1910
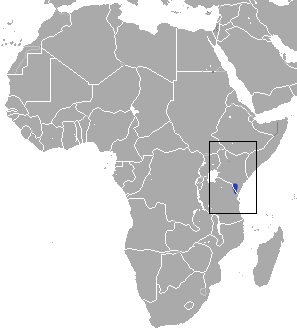
- Xanthippe's shrew range

Species of mammal

Xanthippe's shrew (Crocidura xantippe) is a species of mammal in the family Soricidae. It is found in Kenya and Tanzania. Its natural habitats are dry savanna and subtropical or tropical dry shrubland.
