= Newmark's shrew =

Conservation status
- Near Threatened (IUCN 3.1)

Scientific classification
- Kingdom: Animalia
- Phylum: Chordata
- Class: Mammalia
- Order: Eulipotyphla
- Family: Soricidae
- Genus: Crocidura
- Species: C. newmarki

Binomial name
- Crocidura newmarki Stanley, Hutterer, Giarla & Esselstyn, 2015

Species of mammal

Newmark's shrew (Crocidura newmarki) is a species of mammal in the family Soricidae. It is endemic to Tanzania.

It is restricted to Mt. Meru, where it is one of two endemic mammals, alongside Verhagen's brush-furred rat (Lophuromys verhageni). It inhabits montane forest and heath above the treeline. It has a head to rump length of 65–85 millimetres (2.6–3.3 in), a tail of 45–60 millimetres (1.8–2.4 in) and a weight of 6–11 grams (0.21–0.39 oz). The hairs are gray with brown tips. It is named in honor of American conservation biologist William Newmark, who conducted significant research into the biodiversity of Tanzania.

It is considered near threatened as its mountain habitats may be threatened in the future by climate change, and possibly disturbance from tourism.
