= Gracile naked-tailed shrew =

Conservation status
- Least Concern (IUCN 3.1)

Scientific classification
- Kingdom: Animalia
- Phylum: Chordata
- Class: Mammalia
- Order: Eulipotyphla
- Family: Soricidae
- Genus: Crocidura
- Species: C. maurisca

Binomial name
- Crocidura maurisca Thomas, 1904
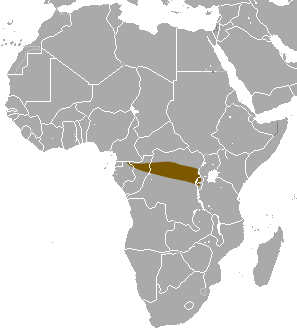
- Gracile naked-tailed shrew range

Species of mammal

The gracile naked-tailed shrew (Crocidura maurisca) is a species of mammal in the family Soricidae. It is found in Burundi, Gabon, Kenya, and Uganda. Its natural habitat is swamps.
