= Hill's shrew =

Conservation status
- Data Deficient (IUCN 3.1)

Scientific classification
- Kingdom: Animalia
- Phylum: Chordata
- Class: Mammalia
- Order: Eulipotyphla
- Family: Soricidae
- Genus: Crocidura
- Species: C. hilliana

Binomial name
- Crocidura hilliana Jenkins & Smith, 1995
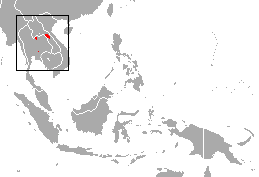
- Hill's shrew range

Species of mammal

Hill's shrew (Crocidura hilliana) is a species of mammal in the family Soricidae. It is found in Thailand and Laos.
