= Greenwood's shrew =

Conservation status
- Least Concern (IUCN 3.1)

Scientific classification
- Kingdom: Animalia
- Phylum: Chordata
- Class: Mammalia
- Order: Eulipotyphla
- Family: Soricidae
- Genus: Crocidura
- Species: C. greenwoodi

Binomial name
- Crocidura greenwoodi Heim de Balsac, 1966
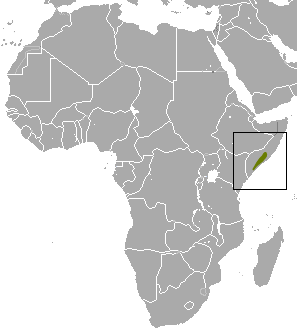
- Greenwood's shrew range

Species of mammal

The Greenwood's shrew (Crocidura greenwoodi) is a species of mammal in the family Soricidae. It is endemic to Somalia. Its natural habitats are subtropical or tropical moist lowland forest, dry savanna, subtropical or tropical dry shrubland, and arable land.
