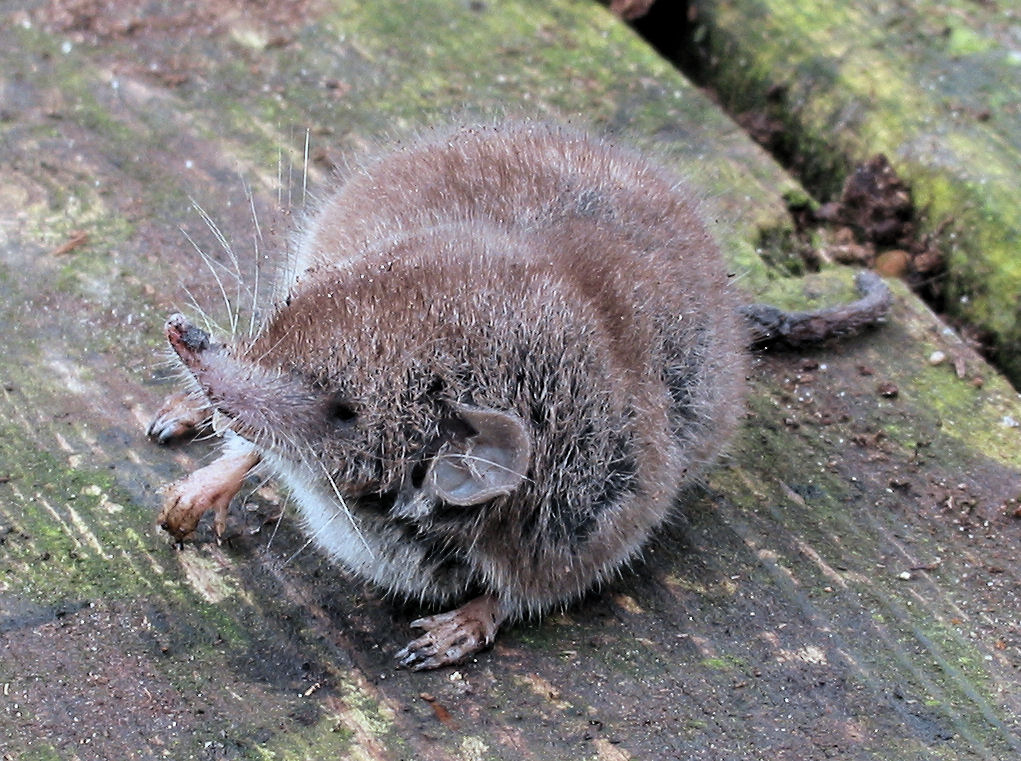
- Greater white-toothed shrew, C. russula

Scientific classification
- Kingdom: Animalia
- Phylum: Chordata
- Class: Mammalia
- Order: Eulipotyphla
- Family: Soricidae
- Subfamily: Crocidurinae
- Genus: Crocidura; Wagler, 1832

Type species
- Sorex leucodon (Hermann, 1780)

Species
- See text.

= Crocidura =

Crocidura Temporal range: Late Miocene–recent

Genus of mammals

The genus Crocidura is one of nine genera of the shrew subfamily Crocidurinae. Members of the genus are commonly called white-toothed shrews or musk shrews, although both also apply to all of the species in the subfamily. With over 180 species, Crocidura contains the most species of any mammal genus. The genus name Crocidura comes from Ancient Greek κροκύς (krokús), meaning "piece of wool", and οὐρά (ourá), meaning "tail", and thus, "woolly tail", referring to the species' tails being covered in short hairs interspersed with longer ones.

They are found throughout all tropical and temperate regions of the Old World, from South Africa north to Europe, and east throughout Asia, as far east as the Malay Archipelago. One species, the possibly extinct Christmas Island shrew (C. trichura), also inhabited Christmas Island. They likely originated in Africa or Asia Minor during the Miocene, spread to Europe by the early Pliocene, and spread to eastern Asia and the Mediterranean by the Pleistocene.

== List of species ==
=== Extant species ===
- Javan hidden shrew (C. abscondita)
- Sanetti shrew (C. afeworkbekelei)
- Cyrenaica shrew (C. aleksandrisi)
- East African highland shrew (C. allex)
- Andaman shrew (C. andamanensis)
- Anhui white-toothed shrew (C. anhuiensis)
- Annamite shrew (C. annamitensis)
- Ansell's shrew (C. ansellorum)
- Arabian shrew (C. arabica)
- Jackass shrew (C. arispa)
- Armenian shrew (C. armenica)
- Asian gray shrew (C. attenuata)
- Hun shrew (C. attila)
- Southwest peninsula white-toothed shrew (C. australis)
- Bailey's shrew (C. baileyi)
- Balete's white-toothed shrew (C. baletei)
- Balingka white-toothed shrew (C. balingka)
- Kinabalu shrew (C. baluensis)
- Batak shrew (C. batakorum)
- Mindanao shrew (C. beatus)
- Beccari's shrew (C. beccarii)
- Bottego's shrew (C. bottegi)
- Bale shrew (C. bottegoides)
- Short-tailed white-toothed shrew (C. brevicauda)
- Thick-tailed shrew (C. brunnea)
- Buettikofer's shrew (C. buettikoferi)
- African dusky shrew (C. caliginea)
- Canarian shrew (C. canariensis)
- Caspian shrew (C. caspica)
- Thick-tailed Sulawesi white-toothed shrew (C. caudicrassa)
- Sulawesi hairy-tailed shrew (C. caudipilosa)
- Cinderella shrew (C. cinderella)
- Congo white-toothed shrew (C. congobelgica)
- Cranbrook's shrew (C. cranbooki)
- Long-footed shrew (C. crenata)
- Crosse's shrew (C. crossei)
- Reddish-gray musk shrew (C. cyanea)
- Dent's shrew (C. denti)
- Desperate shrew (C. desperata)
- Dhofar shrew (C. dhofarensis)
- Long-tailed musk shrew (C. dolichura)
- Dongjiangyuan white-toothed shrew (C. dongyangjiangensis)
- Doucet's musk shrew (C. douceti)
- Dracula shrew (C. dracula)
- Dsinezumi shrew (C. dsinezumi)
- Ivory Coast white-toothed shrew (C. eburnea)
- Eisentraut's shrew (C. eisentrauti)
- Elgon shrew (C. elgonius)
- Elongated shrew (C. elongata)
- Heather shrew (C. erica)
- Fingui white-toothed shrew (C. fingui)
- Fischer's shrew (C. fischeri)
- Greater red musk shrew (C. flavescens)
- Flower's shrew (C. floweri)
- Bornean shrew (C. foetida)
- Fox's shrew (C. foxi)
- Southeast Asian shrew (C. fuliginosa)
- Savanna shrew (C. fulvastra)
- Smoky white-toothed shrew (C. fumosa)
- Bicolored musk shrew (C. fuscomurina)
- Gathorne's shrew (C. gathornei)
- Glass's shrew (C. glassi)
- Gmelin's white-toothed shrew (C. gmelini)
- Goliath shrew (C. goliath)
- Peters's musk shrew (C. gracilipes)
- Large-headed forest shrew (C. grandiceps)
- Greater Mindanao shrew (C. grandis)
- Grasse's shrew (C. grassei)
- Luzon shrew (C. grayi)
- Greenwood's shrew (C. greenwoodi)
- Güldenstädt's shrew (C. gueldenstaedtii)
- Guy's shrew (C. guy)
- Harenna shrew (C. harenna)
- Sinharaja shrew (Crocidura hikmiya)
- Hildegarde's shrew (C. hildegardeae)
- Hill's shrew (C. hilliana)
- Lesser red musk shrew (C. hirta)
- Andaman spiny shrew (C. hispida)
- Horsfield's shrew (C. horsfieldii)
- Hutan shrew (C. hutanis)
- Indochinese shrew (C. indochinensis)
- Jackson's shrew (C. jacksoni)
- Jenkins' shrew (C. jenkinsi)
- Jouvenet's shrew (C. jouvenetae)
- Katinka's shrew (C. katinka)
- Kego shrew (Crocidura kegoensis)
- Kivu shrew (C. kivuana)
- Lamotte's shrew (C. lamottei)
- Kivu long-haired shrew (C. lanosa)
- Ussuri white-toothed shrew (C. lasiura)
- Latona's shrew (C. latona)
- Sulawesi shrew (C. lea)
- Sumatran giant shrew (C. lepidura)
- Bicolored shrew (C. leucodon)
- Sulawesi tiny shrew (C. levicula)
- Naked-tail shrew (C. littoralis)
- Savanna swamp shrew (C. longipes)
- Lucina's shrew (C. lucina)
- Ludia's shrew (C. ludia)
- Moonshine shrew(C. luna)
- Mauritanian shrew (C. lusitania)
- Lwiro shrew (C. lwiroensis)
- MacArthur's shrew (C. macarthuri)
- MacMillan's shrew (C. macmillani)
- Nyiro shrew (C. macowi)
- Malayan shrew (C. malayana)
- Manenguba shrew (C. manengubae)
- Makwassie musk shrew (C. maquassiensis)
- Swamp musk shrew (C. mariquensis)
- Gracile naked-tailed shrew (C. maurisca)
- Javanese shrew (C. maxi)
- Mduma's shrew (C. mdumai)
- Central Sulawesi white-toothed shrew (C. mediocris)
- Small elongated white-toothed shrew (C. microelongata)
- Mindoro shrew (C. mindorus)
- Sri Lankan long-tailed shrew (C. miya)
- Kilimanjaro shrew (C. monax)
- Sunda shrew (C. monticola)
- Montane white-toothed shrew (C. montis)
- Munissi's shrew (C. munissii)
- West African long-tailed shrew (C. muricauda)
- Mossy forest shrew (C. musseri)
- Ugandan musk shrew (C. mutesae)
- Somali dwarf shrew (C. nana)
- Savanna dwarf shrew (C. nanilla)
- Narcondam shrew (C. narcondamica)
- Sumatran white-toothed shrew (C. neglecta)
- Peninsular shrew (C. negligens)
- Negros shrew (C. negrina)
- Newmark's shrew (C. newmarki)
- Nicobar shrew (C. nicobarica)
- Nigerian shrew (C. nigeriae)
- Blackish white-toothed shrew (C. nigricans)
- Black-footed shrew (C. nigripes)
- African black shrew (C. nigrofusca)
- Nimba shrew (C. nimbae)
- Mount Nimba giant forest shrew (C. nimbasilvanus)
- Sibuyan shrew (C. ninoyi)
- Niobe's shrew (C. niobe)
- Typical Sulawesi white-toothed shrew (C. normalis)
- West African pygmy shrew (C. obscurior)
- African giant shrew (C. olivieri)
- West Sulawesi white-toothed shrew (C. ordinaria)
- Oriental shrew (C. orientalis)
- Ryukyu shrew (C. orii)
- North African white-toothed shrew (C. pachyura)
- Palawan shrew (C. palawanensis)
- Pallid-footed white-toothed shrew (C. pallida)
- Panay shrew (C. panayensis)
- Sumatran long-tailed shrew (C. paradoxura)
- Tiny Sulawesi white-toothed shrew (C. parva)
- Small-footed shrew (C. parvipes)
- Sahelian tiny shrew (C. pasha)
- Pale gray shrew (C. pergrisea)
- Guramba shrew (C. phaeura)
- Dr. Phan Luong shrew (C. phanluongi))
- Phu Hoc shrew (C. phuquocensis)
- Cameroonian shrew (C. picea)
- Pitman's shrew (C. pitmani)
- Flat-headed shrew (C. planiceps)
- Fraser's musk shrew (C. poensis)
- Polia's shrew (C. polia)
- North peninsula white-toothed shrew (C. pseudorhoditis)
- Kashmir white-toothed shrew (C. pullata)
- Southern elongated white-toothed shrew (C. quasielongata)
- Rainey's shrew (C. raineyi)
- Negev shrew (C. ramona)
- Chinese white-toothed shrew (C. rapax)
- Egyptian pygmy shrew (C. religiosa)
- Sulawesi white-handed shrew (C. rhoditis)
- Roosevelt's shrew (C. roosevelti)
- Greater white-toothed shrew (C. russula)
- Sa Pa shrew (C. sapaensis)
- Ugandan lowland shrew (C. selina)
- Lesser rock shrew (C. serezkyensis)
- Asian lesser white-toothed shrew (C. shantungensis)
- Siberian shrew (C. sibirica)
- Sicilian shrew (C. sicula)
- Lesser gray-brown musk shrew (C. silacea)
- Mebado white-toothed shrew (C. similturba)
- Desert musk shrew (C. smithii)
- Sokolov's shrew (C. sokolovi)
- Somali shrew (C. somalica)
- West-central Sulawesi white-toothed shrew (C. solita)
- Stanley's white-toothed shrew (C. stanleyi)
- Narrow-headed shrew (C. stenocephala)
- Lesser white-toothed shrew (C. suaveolens)
- Iranian shrew (C. susiana)
- Taiwanese gray shrew (C. tanakae)
- Tanzanian shrew (C. tansaniana)
- Tarella shrew (C. tarella)
- Saharan shrew (C. tarfayensis)
- Telford's shrew (C. telfordi)
- Dark white-toothed shrew (C. tenebrosa)
- Timor shrew (C. tenuis)
- Thalia's shrew (C. thalia)
- Therese's shrew (C. theresae)
- São Tomé shrew (C. thomensis)
- Turbo shrew (C. turba)
- Ultimate shrew (C. ultima)
- Javan ghost shrew (C. umbra)
- Usambara shrew (C. usambarae)
- Savanna path shrew (C. viaria)
- Mamfe shrew (C. virgata)
- Voi shrew (C. voi)
- Voracious shrew (C. vorax)
- Banka shrew (C. vosmaeri)
- Lesser Ryukyu shrew (C. watasei)
- Whitaker's shrew (C. whitakeri)
- Wimmer's shrew (C. wimmeri)
- Hainan Island shrew (C. wuchihensis)
- Xanthippe's shrew (C. xantippe)
- Beletta shrew (C. yaldeni)
- Yankari shrew (C. yankariensis)
- Mikhail Zaitsev's shrew (C. zaitsevi)
- Zaphir's shrew (C. zaphiri)
- Zarudny's rock shrew (C. zarudnyi)
- Upemba shrew (C. zimmeri)
- Cretan shrew (C. zimmermanni)

=== Extinct species ===
- †Crocidura balsamifera (known only from embalmed Crocidura mummies from Ancient Egypt)
- † Crocidura trichura (Christmas Island shrew)

=== Fossil species ===
- †Crocidura abdallahi (Pleistocene of Morocco)
- †Crocidura darelbeidae (Pleistocene of Morocco)
- †Crocidura jaegeri (Pleistocene of Morocco)
- †Crocidura kornfeldi (Pliocene to Pleistocene of Europe)
- †Crocidura kapsominensis (Miocene of Kenya)
- †Crocidura maghrebiana (Pleistocene of Morocco)
- †Crocidura marocana (Pleistocene of Morocco)
- †Crocidura tadjerensis (Pleistocene of Morocco)
- †Crocidura thomasi (Pleistocene of Morocco)

A significant diversity of extinct Crocidura species is known from the early-mid Pleistocene of Morocco, but by the majority of these species went extinct between the Middle to Late Pleistocene boundary, and were replaced by modern species. Indeterminate Crocidura remains are known from the Miocene-aged rocks in the Potwar Plateau of Pakistan, concurrent with fossils from the Shivalik Fossil Beds.

== Cultural significance ==
Crocidura shrews were embalmed in Ancient Egypt, being associated with the dark aspect of the god Horus. Many of these mummies have been uncovered during excavations at the Falcon Necropolis, providing important information about the former diversity of shrews in this area.
