= Peters's musk shrew =

Conservation status
- Data Deficient (IUCN 3.1)

Scientific classification
- Kingdom: Animalia
- Phylum: Chordata
- Class: Mammalia
- Order: Eulipotyphla
- Family: Soricidae
- Genus: Crocidura
- Species: C. gracilipes

Binomial name
- Crocidura gracilipes Peters, 1870
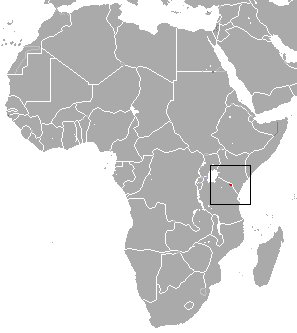
- Peters's musk shrew range

Species of mammal

The Peters's musk shrew (Crocidura gracilipes) is a species of mammal in the family Soricidae. It is endemic to Mount Kilimanjaro in northern Tanzania. Reports of the species near Murchison Falls in western Uganda haven't been verified.
