= Greater Mindanao shrew =

Conservation status
- Data Deficient (IUCN 3.1)

Scientific classification
- Kingdom: Animalia
- Phylum: Chordata
- Class: Mammalia
- Order: Eulipotyphla
- Family: Soricidae
- Genus: Crocidura
- Species: C. grandis

Binomial name
- Crocidura grandis Miller, 1911
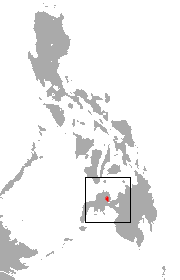
- Greater Mindanao shrew range

Species of mammal

The Greater Mindanao shrew (Crocidura grandis) is a species of mammal in the family Soricidae. It is endemic to the Philippines. Its natural habitat is subtropical or tropical dry forests.
