= Flat-headed shrew =

Conservation status
- Data Deficient (IUCN 3.1)

Scientific classification
- Kingdom: Animalia
- Phylum: Chordata
- Class: Mammalia
- Order: Eulipotyphla
- Family: Soricidae
- Genus: Crocidura
- Species: C. planiceps

Binomial name
- Crocidura planiceps Heller, 1910
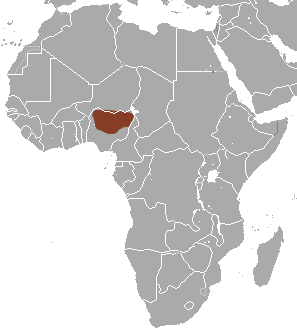
- Flat-headed shrew range

Species of mammal

The flat-headed shrew (Crocidura planiceps) is a species of mammal in the family Soricidae. It is found in the Democratic Republic of the Congo, Ethiopia, Nigeria, and Uganda. The flat-headed shrew is listed as Data Deficient on the IUCN Red List of Threatened Species.

== Sources ==
- Kennerley, R.; Gerrie, R. (2017) [errata version of 2016 assessment]. "Crocidura planiceps". IUCN Red List of Threatened Species. 2016 e.T41351A115180837. doi:10.2305/IUCN.UK.2016-3.RLTS.T41351A22310439.en.
