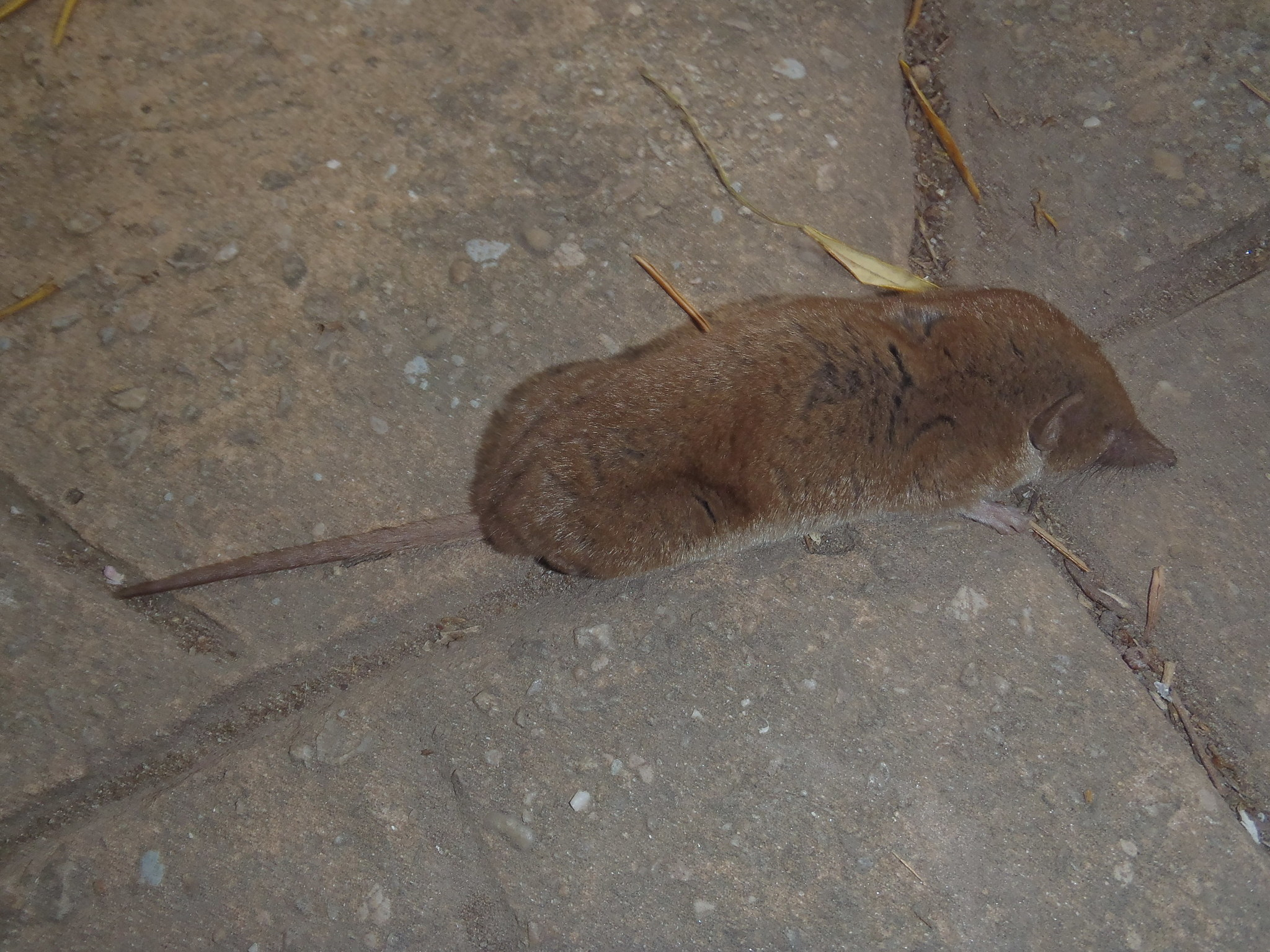

Conservation status
- Least Concern (IUCN 3.1)

Scientific classification
- Kingdom: Animalia
- Phylum: Chordata
- Class: Mammalia
- Infraclass: Placentalia
- Order: Eulipotyphla
- Family: Soricidae
- Genus: Crocidura
- Species: C. cyanea

Binomial name
- Crocidura cyanea (Duvernoy, 1838)
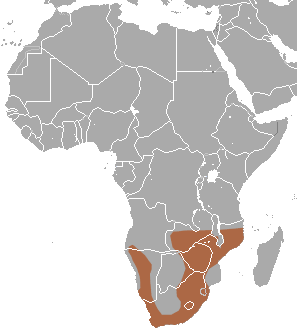
- Reddish-gray musk shrew range

= Reddish-gray musk shrew =

Species of mammal

The reddish-gray musk shrew (Crocidura cyanea) is a species of mammal in the family Soricidae. It is found in Angola, Botswana, Democratic Republic of the Congo, Eswatini, Lesotho, Malawi, Mozambique, Namibia, Nigeria, South Africa, Tanzania, Zambia, and Zimbabwe. Its natural habitats are lowland forests, subtropical or tropical high-elevation grassland, and caves.
