= Hun shrew =

Conservation status
- Least Concern (IUCN 3.1)

Scientific classification
- Kingdom: Animalia
- Phylum: Chordata
- Class: Mammalia
- Order: Eulipotyphla
- Family: Soricidae
- Genus: Crocidura
- Species: C. attila

Binomial name
- Crocidura attila Dollman, 1915
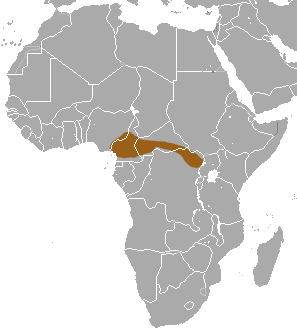
- Hun shrew range

Species of mammal

The Hun shrew (Crocidura attila) is a species of mammal in the family Soricidae. It is found in Cameroon, Central African Republic, Mali, Democratic Republic of the Congo, and Nigeria. Its natural habitats are tropical or subtropical moist lowland or montane forest, and heavily degraded former forest.
