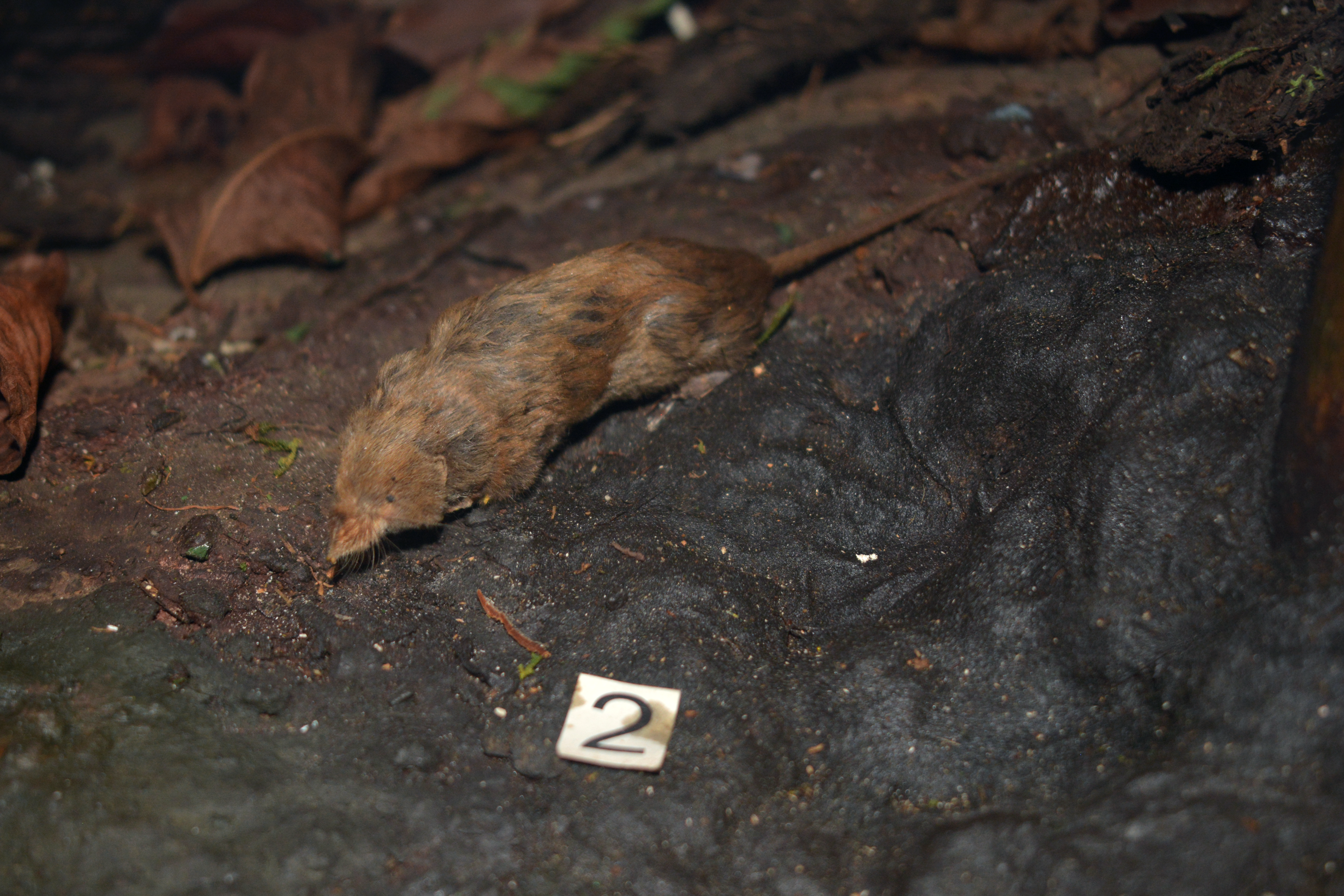
- Taxidermy in Bogor Zoology Museum

Conservation status
- Least Concern (IUCN 3.1)

Scientific classification
- Kingdom: Animalia
- Phylum: Chordata
- Class: Mammalia
- Order: Eulipotyphla
- Family: Soricidae
- Genus: Crocidura
- Species: C. orientalis

Binomial name
- Crocidura orientalis Jentink, 1890
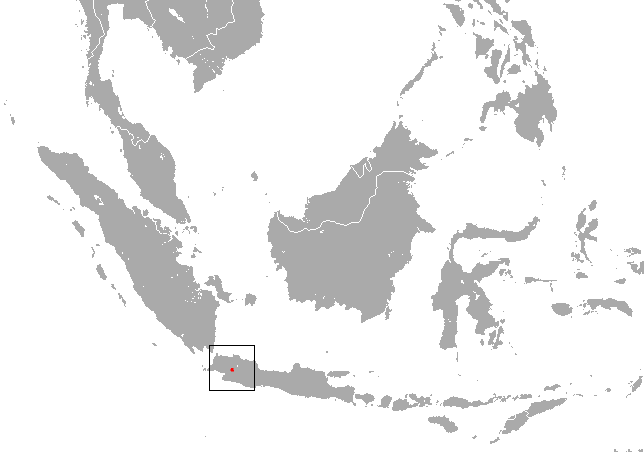
- Oriental shrew range

= Oriental shrew =

Species of mammal

The Oriental shrew (Crocidura orientalis) is a species of mammal in the family Soricidae. It is endemic to Indonesia.
