= Savanna dwarf shrew =

Conservation status
- Least Concern (IUCN 3.1)

Scientific classification
- Kingdom: Animalia
- Phylum: Chordata
- Class: Mammalia
- Order: Eulipotyphla
- Family: Soricidae
- Genus: Crocidura
- Species: C. nanilla

Binomial name
- Crocidura nanilla Thomas, 1909
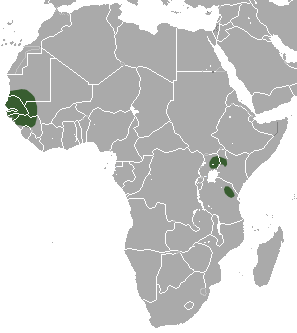
- Savanna dwarf shrew range

Species of mammal

The savanna dwarf shrew (Crocidura nanilla) is a species of mammal in the family Soricidae. It is found in Guinea, Kenya, Mauritania, Senegal, Tanzania, and Uganda. Its natural habitat is savanna.
