= Niobe's shrew =

Conservation status
- Least Concern (IUCN 3.1)

Scientific classification
- Kingdom: Animalia
- Phylum: Chordata
- Class: Mammalia
- Order: Eulipotyphla
- Family: Soricidae
- Genus: Crocidura
- Species: C. niobe

Binomial name
- Crocidura niobe Thomas, 1906
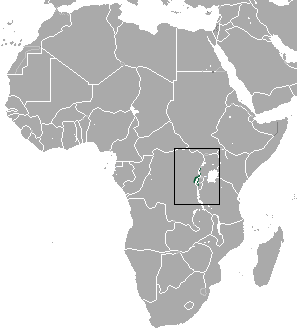
- Niobe's shrew range

Species of mammal

Niobe's shrew (Crocidura niobe) is a species of mammal in the family Soricidae. It is native to the Albertine Rift montane forests.
