= Beccari's shrew =

Conservation status
- Least Concern (IUCN 3.1)

Scientific classification
- Kingdom: Animalia
- Phylum: Chordata
- Class: Mammalia
- Order: Eulipotyphla
- Family: Soricidae
- Genus: Crocidura
- Species: C. beccarii

Binomial name
- Crocidura beccarii Dobson, 1886
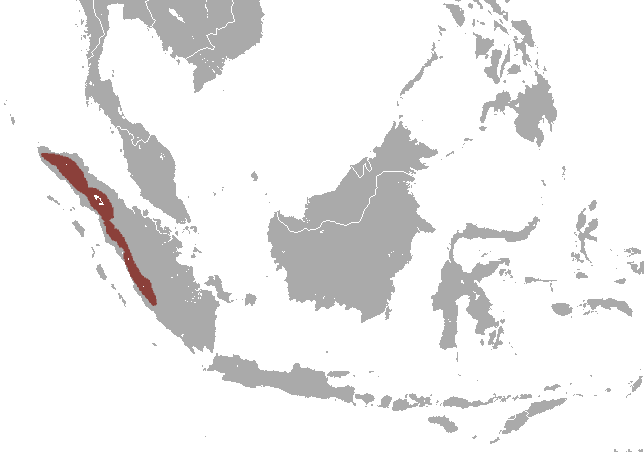
- Beccari's shrew range

Species of mammal

Beccari's shrew (Crocidura beccarii) is a species of mammal in the family Soricidae. It is found in the Barisan Mountains of Sumatra.
