= Sibuyan shrew =

Conservation status
- Data Deficient (IUCN 3.1)

Scientific classification
- Kingdom: Animalia
- Phylum: Chordata
- Class: Mammalia
- Order: Eulipotyphla
- Family: Soricidae
- Genus: Crocidura
- Species: C. ninoyi

Binomial name
- Crocidura ninoyi Esselstyn & Goodman, 2010
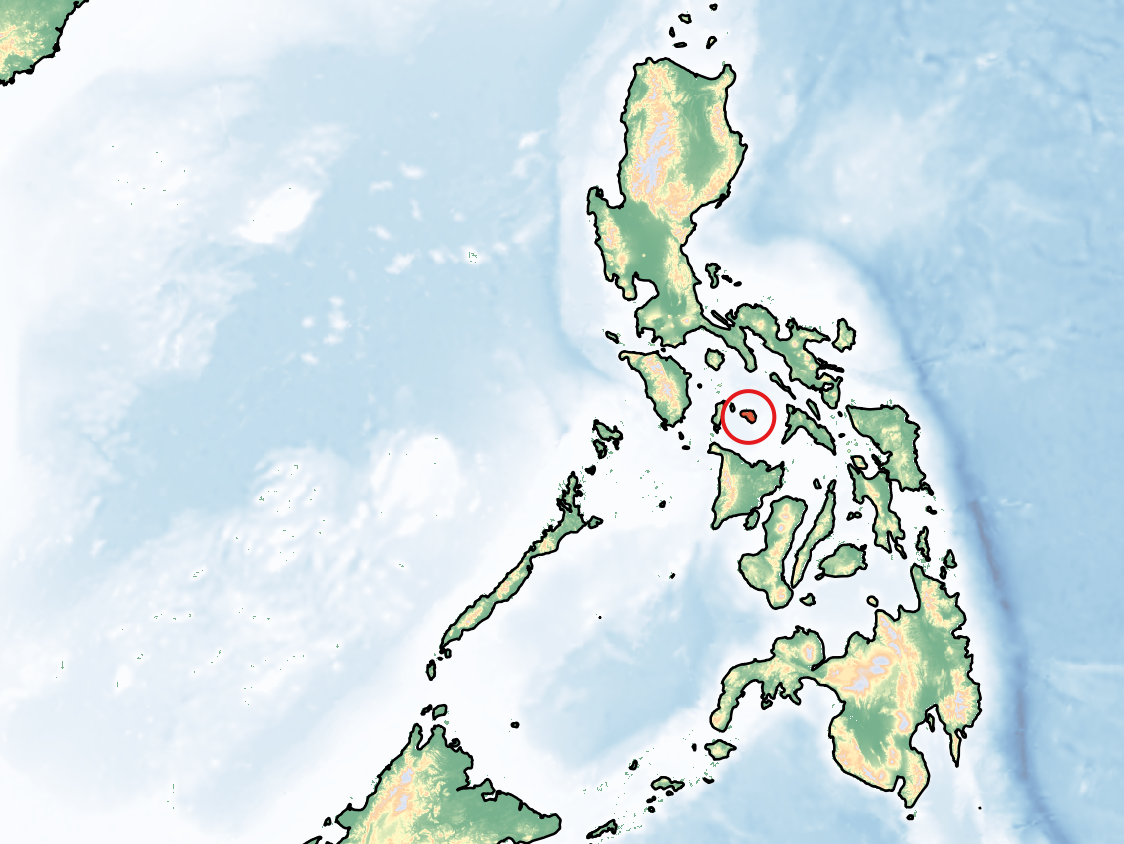

Species of mammal

The Sibuyan shrew (Crocidura ninoyi) is a species of shrew from the Philippines.
