= Sanetti shrew =

Conservation status
- Data Deficient (IUCN 3.1)

Scientific classification
- Kingdom: Animalia
- Phylum: Chordata
- Class: Mammalia
- Order: Eulipotyphla
- Family: Soricidae
- Genus: Crocidura
- Species: C. afeworkbekelei

Binomial name
- Crocidura afeworkbekelei Lavrenchenko, Voyta & Hutterer, 2016

Species of mammal

The Sanetti shrew or Bekele's shrew (Crocidura afeworkbekelei) is a species of mammal in the family Soricidae. It is endemic to Ethiopia.

== Etymology ==
Its specific epithet honors Ethiopian mammalogist Afework Bekele.

== Distribution and habitat ==
This species is thought to be endemic to the Bale Mountains of the Sanetti Plateau in southwestern Ethiopia. It inhabits the Afromontane zone with low and scattered vegetation, at about 4,000 metres (13,120 ft) above sea level.

== Description ==
It is a small shrew, with the head-body length being between 78–85 millimetres (3.1–3.3 in), the length of the tail being between 43–48 millimetres (1.7–1.9 in), the length of the feet between 16.3–17 millimetres (0.64–0.67 in), and the length of the ears between 8.5–10 millimetres (0.33–0.39 in). The dorsal pelage is greyish-brown with the base of the hairs being gray, while the ventral pelage is gray with light yellowish tips. The back of the legs is light gray. The feet are slightly elongated. The tail, between 50.6 and 61.5% of the head-body length, is brown above, brownish-gray below and interspersed with long bristles.

== Conservation status ==
No threats have presently been documented for this species, and it is classified as Data Deficient on the IUCN Red List.
