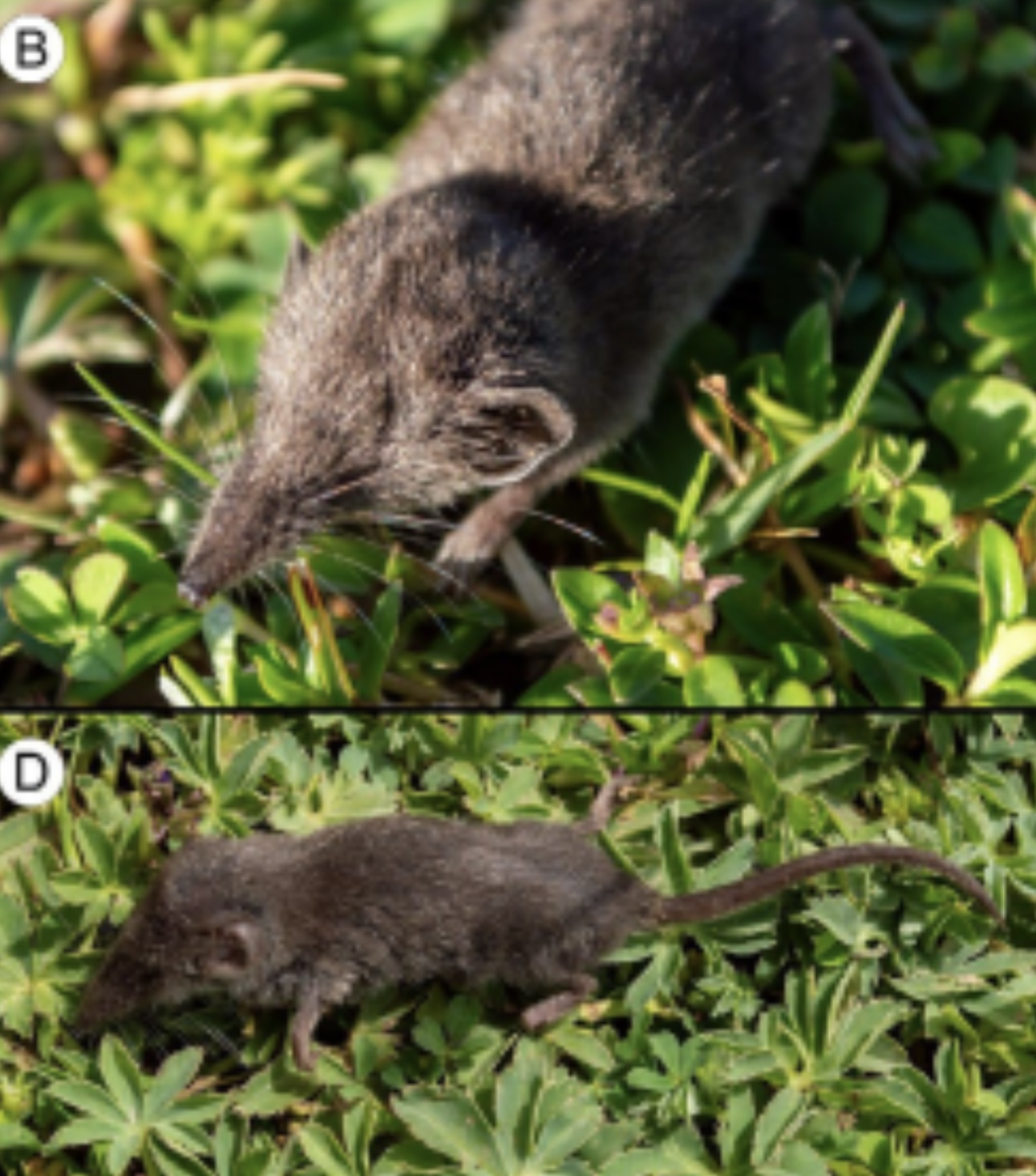

Scientific classification
- Kingdom: Animalia
- Phylum: Chordata
- Class: Mammalia
- Order: Eulipotyphla
- Family: Soricidae
- Genus: Crocidura
- Species: C. stanleyi

Binomial name
- Crocidura stanleyi E. W. Craig, A. Bryjová, J. Bryja, Y. Meheretu, L. A. Lavrenchenko, J. C. Kerbis Peterhans, 2025

= Stanley's white-toothed shrew =

Species of shrew

Stanley's white-toothed shrew, Crocidura stanleyi, is a species of mammal in the family Soricidae. It is endemic to Ethiopia. The species was named after scientist Bill Stanley, whose fieldwork in 2015 garnered the holotype specimen that was eventually used to formally define the species. The species was found in the Ethiopian highlands.

== Description ==
The species is described as one of the smallest mammals on Earth, as it weighs just 3 grams which is equivalent to the weight of an average sugar cube. The species is 5 centimeters in length.

== See also ==
- List of living mammal species described in the 2020s
