= Andaman spiny shrew =

Conservation status
- Vulnerable (IUCN 3.1)

Scientific classification
- Kingdom: Animalia
- Phylum: Chordata
- Class: Mammalia
- Order: Eulipotyphla
- Family: Soricidae
- Genus: Crocidura
- Species: C. hispida

Binomial name
- Crocidura hispida Thomas, 1913
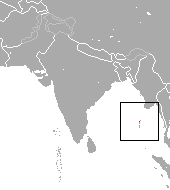
- Andaman spiny shrew range

Species of mammal

The Andaman spiny shrew or Andaman shrew (Crocidura hispida) is a species of mammal in the family Soricidae. It is endemic to India. Its natural habitat is subtropical or tropical dry forests.

== Sources ==
- Molur, S. (2017) [errata version of 2016 assessment]. "Crocidura hispida". IUCN Red List of Threatened Species. 2016 e.T5603A115076898. doi:10.2305/IUCN.UK.2016-3.RLTS.T5603A22299245.en.
