= Lucina's shrew =

Conservation status
- Vulnerable (IUCN 3.1)

Scientific classification
- Domain: Eukaryota
- Kingdom: Animalia
- Phylum: Chordata
- Class: Mammalia
- Order: Eulipotyphla
- Family: Soricidae
- Genus: Crocidura
- Species: C. lucina

Binomial name
- Crocidura lucina Dippenaar, 1980
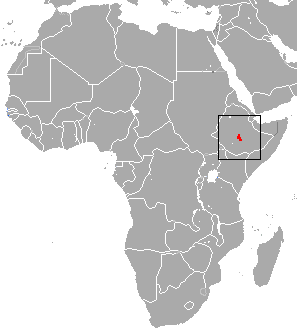
- Lucina's shrew range

Species of mammal

Lucina's shrew (Crocidura lucina) is a species of mammal in the family Soricidae. It is endemic to Ethiopia. The mammal's natural habitats are subtropical or tropical grassland and swamps from 3,000 to 4,050 m (9,840 to 13,290 ft) elevation.
