= Montane white-toothed shrew =

Conservation status
- Least Concern (IUCN 3.1)

Scientific classification
- Kingdom: Animalia
- Phylum: Chordata
- Class: Mammalia
- Order: Eulipotyphla
- Family: Soricidae
- Genus: Crocidura
- Species: C. montis

Binomial name
- Crocidura montis Thomas, 1906
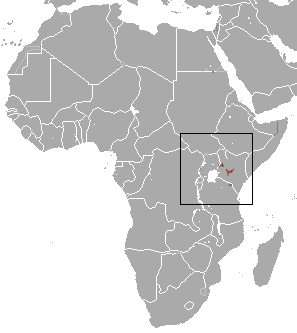
- Montane white-toothed shrew range

Species of mammal

The montane white-toothed shrew (Crocidura montis) is a species of mammal in the family Soricidae. It is found in Kenya, South Sudan, Tanzania, and Uganda. Its natural habitats are subtropical or tropical moist montane forest and subtropical or tropical seasonally wet or flooded lowland grassland. It is threatened by habitat loss.
