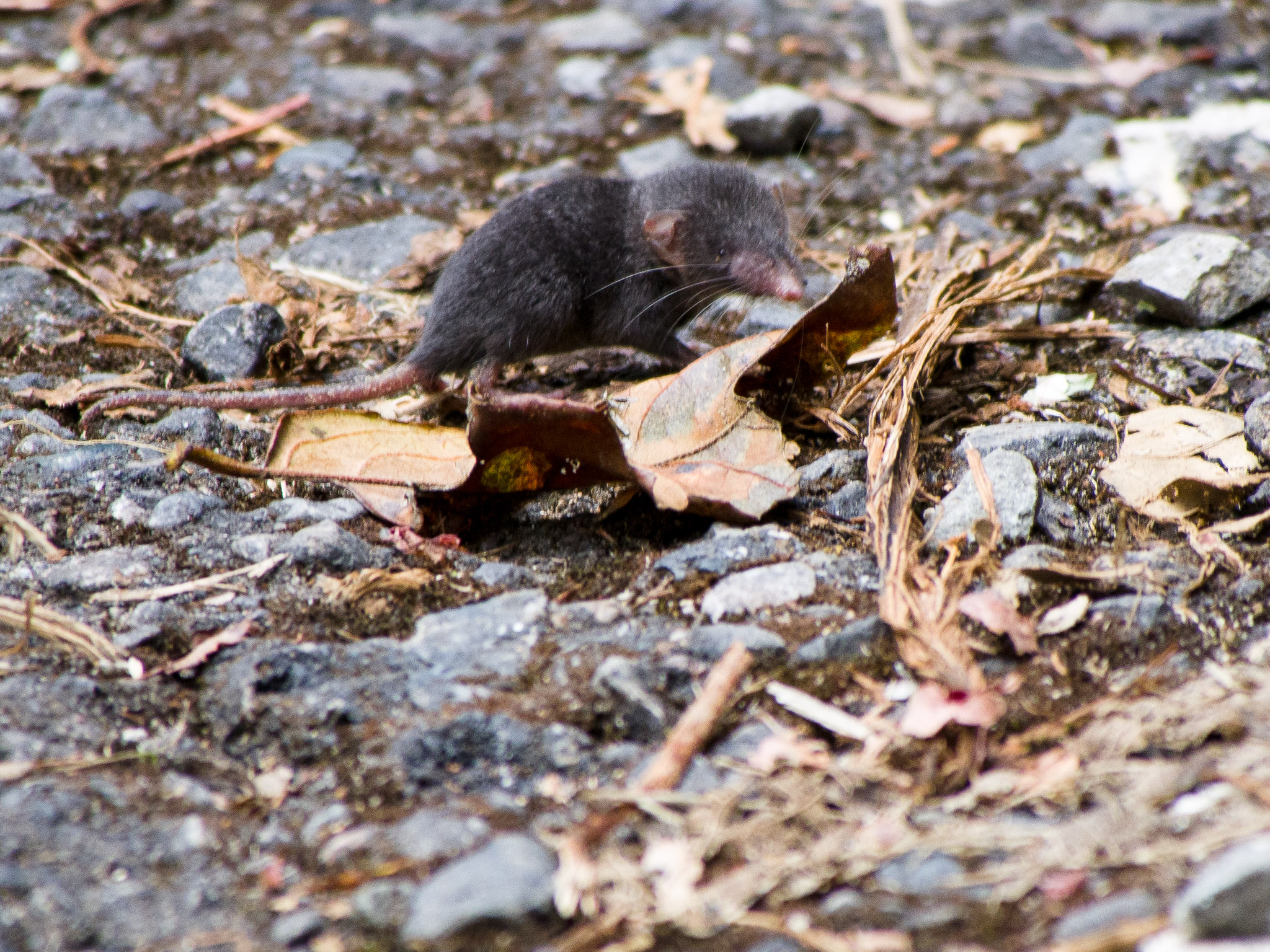

Conservation status
- Least Concern (IUCN 3.1)

Scientific classification
- Kingdom: Animalia
- Phylum: Chordata
- Class: Mammalia
- Order: Eulipotyphla
- Family: Soricidae
- Genus: Crocidura
- Species: C. monticola

Binomial name
- Crocidura monticola Peters, 1870
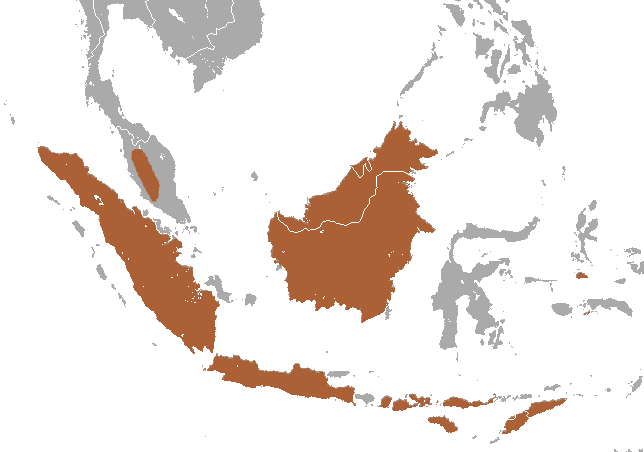
- Sunda shrew range

= Sunda shrew =

Species of mammal

The Sunda shrew (Crocidura monticola) is a species of mammal in the family Soricidae found in Indonesia, Malaysia, and Timor-Leste.

Populations from the Malay Peninsula, Sumatra and Borneo are now considered to belong to Crocidura neglecta. The widespread species C. neglecta sensu lato, exhibits high levels of diversity. The divergence among populations from Peninsular Malaysia, west Borneo and north-east Borneo is higher than that among many other recognised related species, suggesting that these might deserve specific status. Species delimitation based on private allele sharing also supports the species-level recognition of these populations and perhaps also that of the Bukit Baka population. However, these have not been described due to lack of morphological evidence and the small number of localities included in species delimitation analyses. An increase in specimen collection and geographic coverage is needed to characterize the fine-scale distribution of this diversity and resolve the taxonomy of this group.

It is found in the forest floor of the rainforest. It is an omnivore and feeds mostly on plants and leaves that fall from the emergent and the canopy layers. It is 25 cm (9.8 in) long and weighs less than 8 g (0.28 oz).
