= Guramba shrew =

Conservation status
- Endangered (IUCN 3.1)

Scientific classification
- Kingdom: Animalia
- Phylum: Chordata
- Class: Mammalia
- Order: Eulipotyphla
- Family: Soricidae
- Genus: Crocidura
- Species: C. phaeura

Binomial name
- Crocidura phaeura Osgood, 1936
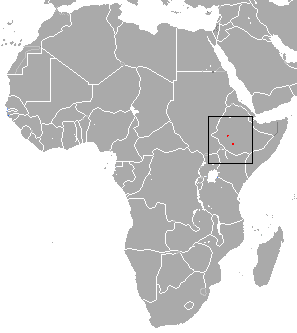
- Guramba shrew range

Species of mammal

The Guramba shrew (Crocidura phaeura) is a species of mammal in the family Soricidae. It is endemic to Ethiopia. Its natural habitats are subtropical or tropical dry forests.

== Sources ==
- Lavrenchenko, L. (2017) [errata version of 2016 assessment]. "Crocidura phaeura". IUCN Red List of Threatened Species. 2016 e.T5580A115075271. doi:10.2305/IUCN.UK.2016-3.RLTS.T5580A22304906.en.
