= Desperate shrew =

Conservation status
- Vulnerable (IUCN 3.1)

Scientific classification
- Kingdom: Animalia
- Phylum: Chordata
- Class: Mammalia
- Order: Eulipotyphla
- Family: Soricidae
- Genus: Crocidura
- Species: C. desperata

Binomial name
- Crocidura desperata Hutterer, Jenkins & Verheyen, 1991
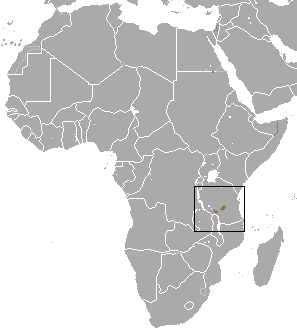
- Desperate shrew range

Species of mammal

The desperate shrew (Crocidura desperata) is a species of mammal in the family Soricidae. It is endemic to Tanzania. Its natural habitat is subtropical or tropical moist montane forests.
