= Ludia's shrew =

Conservation status
- Least Concern (IUCN 3.1)

Scientific classification
- Kingdom: Animalia
- Phylum: Chordata
- Class: Mammalia
- Order: Eulipotyphla
- Family: Soricidae
- Genus: Crocidura
- Species: C. ludia

Binomial name
- Crocidura ludia Hollister, 1916
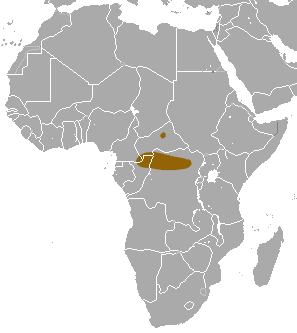
- Ludia's shrew range

Species of mammal

Ludia's shrew (Crocidura ludia) is a species of mammal in the family Soricidae. It is found in Cameroon, Central African Republic, Republic of the Congo, and Democratic Republic of the Congo. Its natural habitat is subtropical or tropical moist lowland forests.
