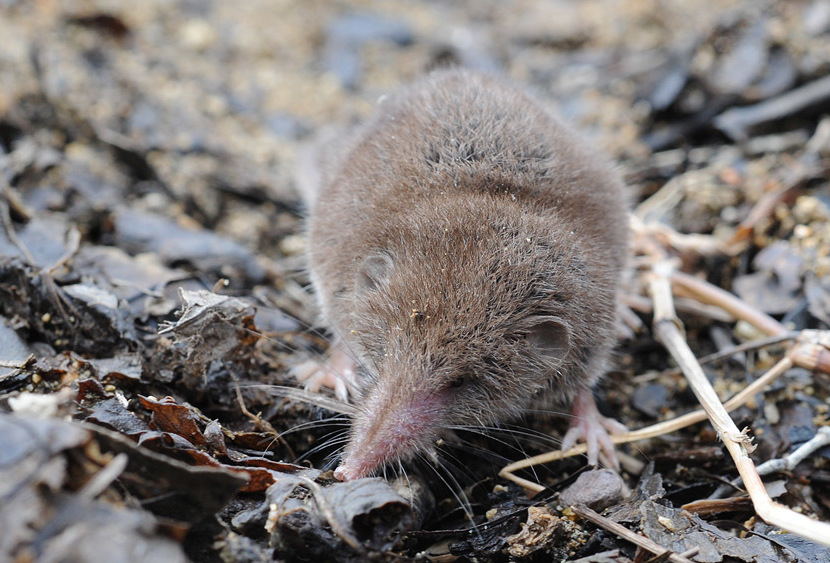

Conservation status
- Least Concern (IUCN 3.1)

Scientific classification
- Kingdom: Animalia
- Phylum: Chordata
- Class: Mammalia
- Order: Eulipotyphla
- Family: Soricidae
- Genus: Crocidura
- Species: C. shantungensis

Binomial name
- Crocidura shantungensis Miller, 1901
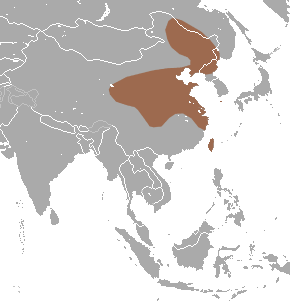
- Asian lesser white-toothed shrew range

= Asian lesser white-toothed shrew =

Species of mammal

The Asian lesser white-toothed shrew (Crocidura shantungensis) is a species of mammal in the family Soricidae. It is found in Siberia, China, Korea, and Japan.
