= Pale gray shrew =

Conservation status
- Data Deficient (IUCN 3.1)

Scientific classification
- Kingdom: Animalia
- Phylum: Chordata
- Class: Mammalia
- Order: Eulipotyphla
- Family: Soricidae
- Genus: Crocidura
- Species: C. pergrisea

Binomial name
- Crocidura pergrisea Miller, 1913
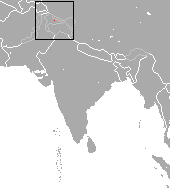
- Pale gray shrew range

Species of mammal

The pale gray shrew (Crocidura pergrisea) is a species of mammal in the family Soricidae. It is endemic to Pakistan and is distributed in the Shigar valley and the western edge of Deosai.
