= Butiaba naked-tailed shrew =

Conservation status
- Least Concern (IUCN 3.1)

Scientific classification
- Kingdom: Animalia
- Phylum: Chordata
- Class: Mammalia
- Order: Eulipotyphla
- Family: Soricidae
- Genus: Crocidura
- Species: C. littoralis

Binomial name
- Crocidura littoralis Heller, 1910
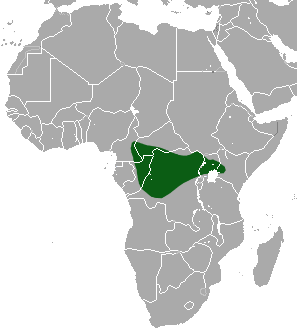
- Naked-tail shrew range

Species of mammal

The Butiaba naked-tailed shrew (Crocidura littoralis) is a species of mammal in the family Soricidae. It is found in Cameroon, Central African Republic, Republic of the Congo, Democratic Republic of the Congo, Kenya, and Uganda. Its natural habitat is subtropical or tropical moist lowland forests.
