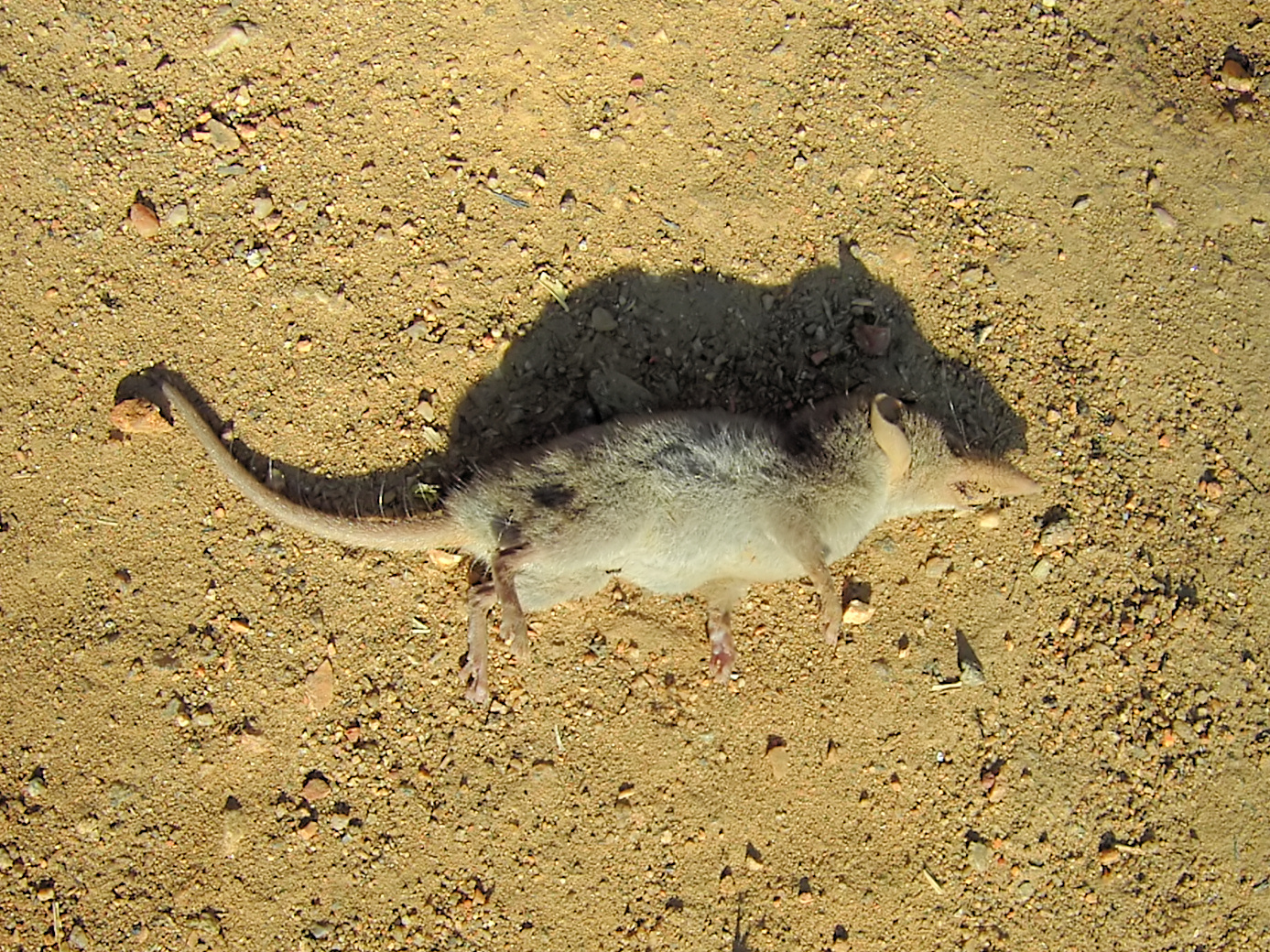

Conservation status
- Least Concern (IUCN 3.1)

Scientific classification
- Kingdom: Animalia
- Phylum: Chordata
- Class: Mammalia
- Order: Eulipotyphla
- Family: Soricidae
- Genus: Crocidura
- Species: C. hirta

Binomial name
- Crocidura hirta Peters, 1852
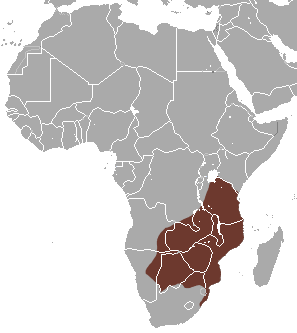
- Lesser red musk shrew range

= Lesser red musk shrew =

Species of mammal

The lesser red musk shrew (Crocidura hirta) is a species of mammal in the family Soricidae. It is found in Angola, Botswana, Democratic Republic of the Congo, Malawi, Mozambique, Namibia, South Africa, Eswatini, Tanzania, Zambia, and Zimbabwe. Its natural habitat are savanna, subtropical or tropical dry lowland grassland, and hot deserts.
