= Glass's shrew =

Conservation status
- Near Threatened (IUCN 3.1)

Scientific classification
- Kingdom: Animalia
- Phylum: Chordata
- Class: Mammalia
- Order: Eulipotyphla
- Family: Soricidae
- Genus: Crocidura
- Species: C. glassi

Binomial name
- Crocidura glassi Heim de Balsac, 1966
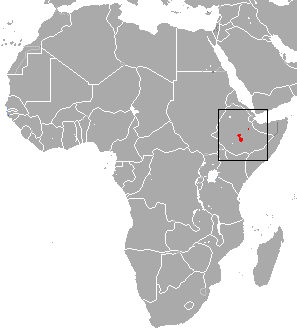
- Glass's shrew range

Species of mammal

Glass's shrew (Crocidura glassi) is a species of mammal in the family Soricidae. It is endemic to Ethiopia. The mammal's natural habitats are subtropical or tropical high-elevation shrubland and grassland, and swamps.
