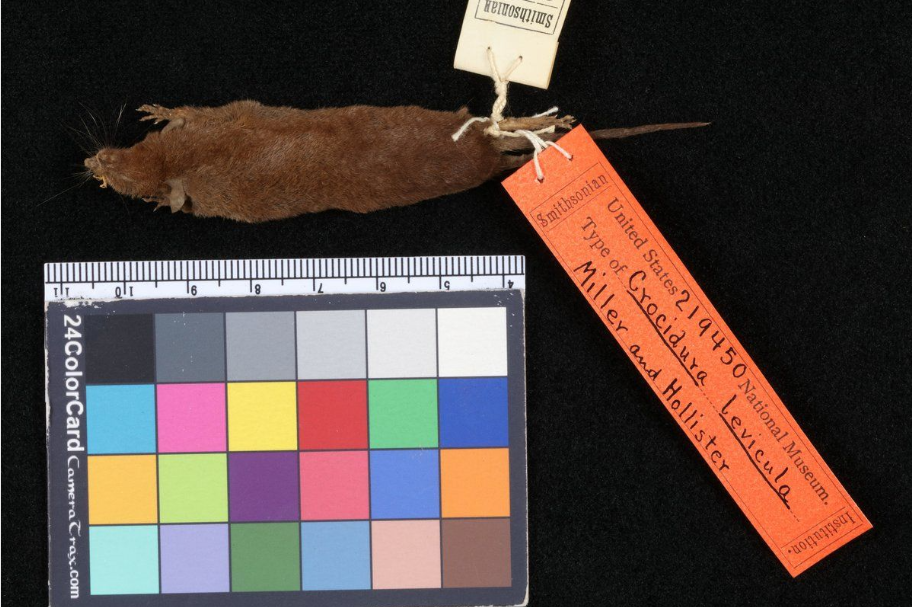

Conservation status
- Least Concern (IUCN 3.1)

Scientific classification
- Kingdom: Animalia
- Phylum: Chordata
- Class: Mammalia
- Order: Eulipotyphla
- Family: Soricidae
- Genus: Crocidura
- Species: C. levicula

Binomial name
- Crocidura levicula Miller & Hollister, 1921
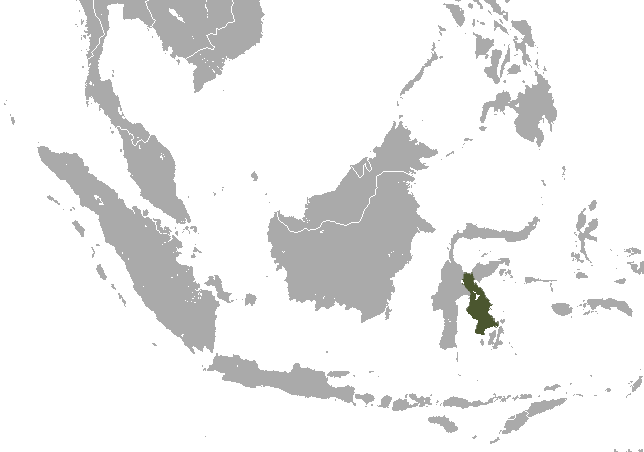
- Sulawesi tiny shrew range

= Sulawesi tiny shrew =

Species of mammal

The Sulawesi tiny shrew (Crocidura levicula) is a species of mammal in the family Soricidae. It is endemic to the island of Sulawesi in Indonesia.
