= Siberian shrew =

Conservation status
- Least Concern (IUCN 3.1)

Scientific classification
- Kingdom: Animalia
- Phylum: Chordata
- Class: Mammalia
- Order: Eulipotyphla
- Family: Soricidae
- Genus: Crocidura
- Species: C. sibirica

Binomial name
- Crocidura sibirica Dukelsky, 1930
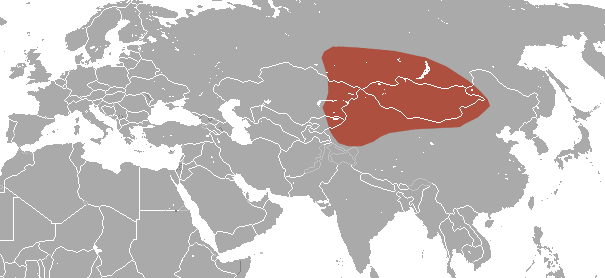
- Siberian shrew range

Species of mammal

The Siberian shrew (Crocidura sibirica) is a species of mammal in the family Soricidae. It is found in Russia, and possibly China and Mongolia.
