= Kilimanjaro shrew =

Conservation status
- Data Deficient (IUCN 3.1)

Scientific classification
- Kingdom: Animalia
- Phylum: Chordata
- Class: Mammalia
- Order: Eulipotyphla
- Family: Soricidae
- Genus: Crocidura
- Species: C. monax

Binomial name
- Crocidura monax Thomas, 1910
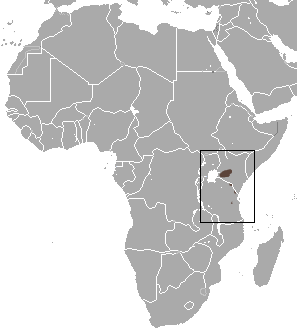
- Kilimanjaro shrew range

Species of mammal

The Kilimanjaro shrew (Crocidura monax) is a species of mammal in the family Soricidae. It is found in Kenya and Tanzania. It is a small to medium sized shrew with brown pelage. 77% of Kilimanjaro shrews are in the West Usambara Mountains. These animals use forests as their habitats.
