= Crocidura caudicrassa =

Conservation status
- Vulnerable (IUCN 3.1)

Scientific classification
- Kingdom: Animalia
- Phylum: Chordata
- Class: Mammalia
- Order: Eulipotyphla
- Family: Soricidae
- Genus: Crocidura
- Species: C. caudicrassa

Binomial name
- Crocidura caudicrassa Esselstyn, Achmadi, Handika, Swanson, Giarla, & Rowe, 2021

Species of shrew

Crocidura caudicrassa, the thick-tailed Sulawesi white-toothed shrew, is a vulnerable species of white-toothed shrew endemic to Sulawesi, Indonesia.
