= Saharan shrew =

Conservation status
- Data Deficient (IUCN 3.1)

Scientific classification
- Kingdom: Animalia
- Phylum: Chordata
- Class: Mammalia
- Order: Eulipotyphla
- Family: Soricidae
- Genus: Crocidura
- Species: C. tarfayensis

Binomial name
- Crocidura tarfayensis Vesmanis & Vesmanis, 1980
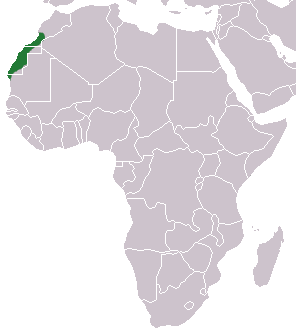
- Saharan shrew range

Species of mammal

The Saharan shrew (Crocidura tarfayensis) is a species of mammal in the family Soricidae. It is found in Western Sahara, Mauritania and Morocco. Its natural habitats are rocky areas and sandy shores.
