= Blackish white-toothed shrew =

Conservation status
- Least Concern (IUCN 3.1)

Scientific classification
- Kingdom: Animalia
- Phylum: Chordata
- Class: Mammalia
- Order: Eulipotyphla
- Family: Soricidae
- Genus: Crocidura
- Species: C. nigricans

Binomial name
- Crocidura nigricans Bocage, 1889
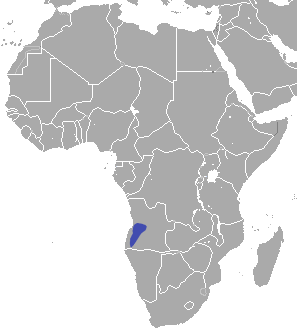
- Blackish white-toothed shrew range

Species of mammal

The blackish white-toothed shrew (Crocidura nigricans) is a species of mammal in the family Soricidae. It is endemic to Angola.
