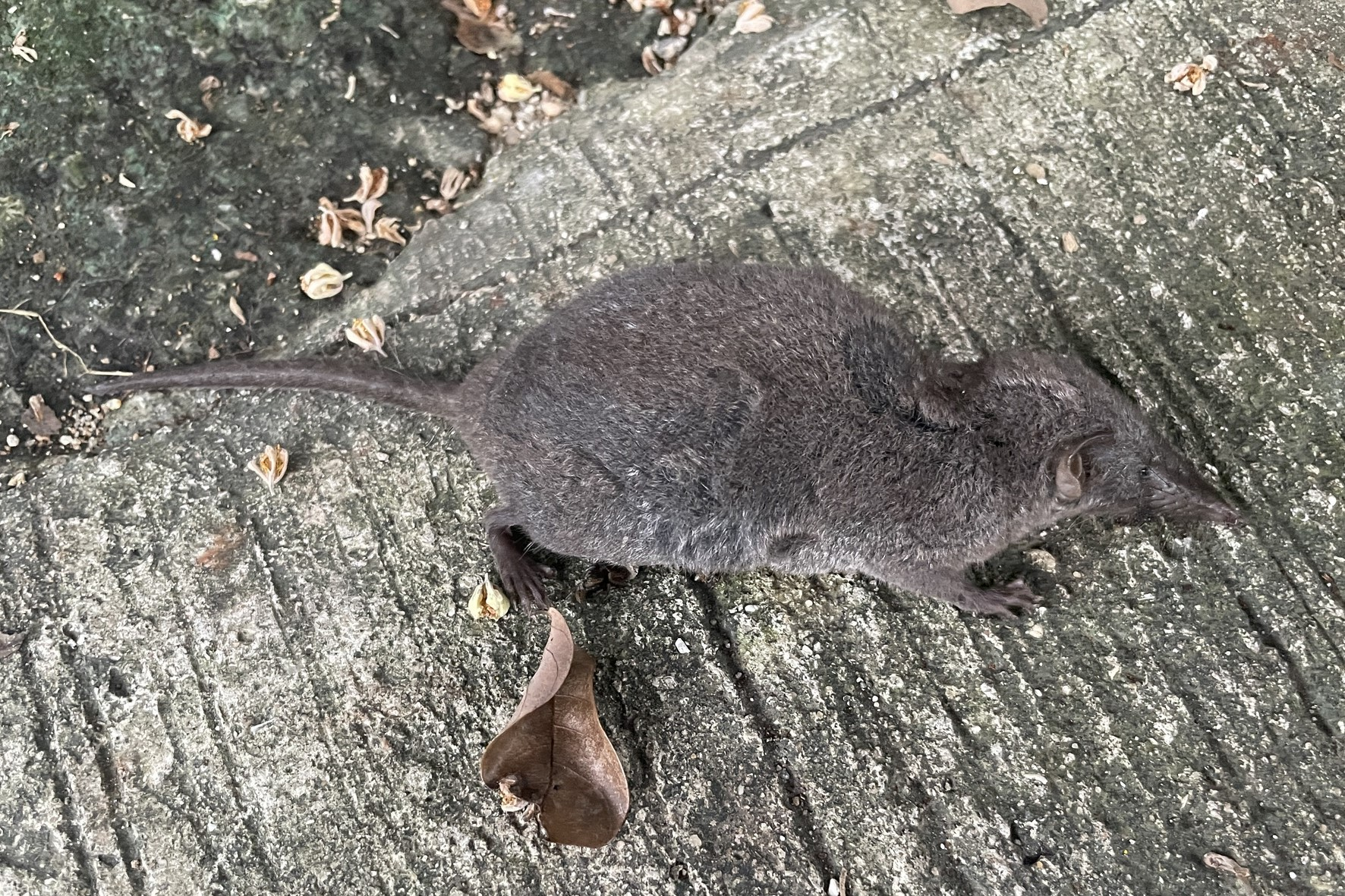

Conservation status
- Least Concern (IUCN 3.1)

Scientific classification
- Kingdom: Animalia
- Phylum: Chordata
- Class: Mammalia
- Order: Eulipotyphla
- Family: Soricidae
- Genus: Crocidura
- Species: C. tanakae

Binomial name
- Crocidura tanakae Kuroda, 1938
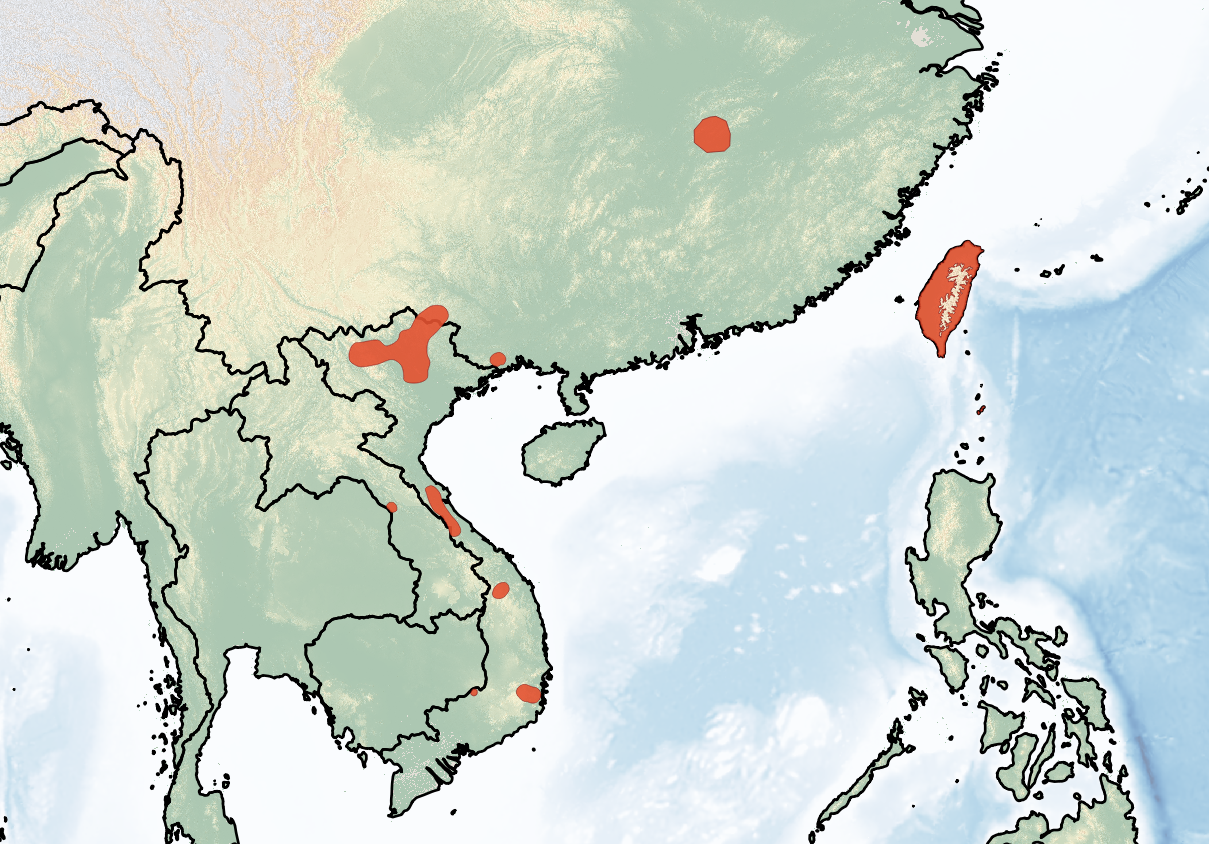

= Taiwanese gray shrew =

Species of mammal

The Taiwanese gray shrew (Crocidura tanakae) is a species of mammal in the family Soricidae. Previously believed to be endemic to Taiwan, it is now also known to occur in Vietnam.
