= Doucet's musk shrew =

Conservation status
- Least Concern (IUCN 3.1)

Scientific classification
- Kingdom: Animalia
- Phylum: Chordata
- Class: Mammalia
- Order: Eulipotyphla
- Family: Soricidae
- Genus: Crocidura
- Species: C. douceti

Binomial name
- Crocidura douceti Heim de Balsac, 1957
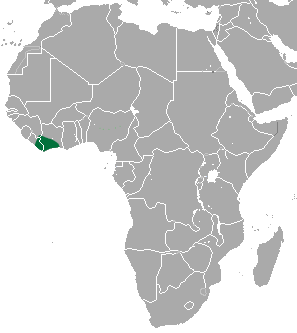
- Doucet's musk shrew range

Species of mammal

Doucet's musk shrew (Crocidura douceti) is a species of mammal in the family Soricidae. It is found in Ivory Coast, Liberia, and possibly Nigeria. Its natural habitat is subtropical or tropical dry forests.
