= Lesser gray-brown musk shrew =

Conservation status
- Least Concern (IUCN 3.1)

Scientific classification
- Kingdom: Animalia
- Phylum: Chordata
- Class: Mammalia
- Order: Eulipotyphla
- Family: Soricidae
- Genus: Crocidura
- Species: C. silacea

Binomial name
- Crocidura silacea Thomas, 1895
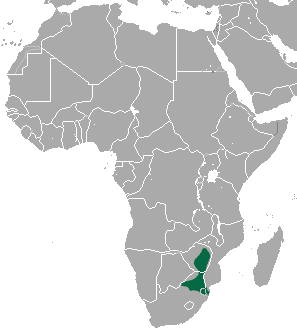
- Lesser gray-brown musk shrew range

Species of mammal

The lesser gray-brown musk shrew (Crocidura silacea) is a species of mammal in the family Soricidae. It is found in Angola, Malawi, Mozambique, South Africa, Swaziland, Tanzania, Uganda, Zambia, and Zimbabwe. Its natural habitats are dry savanna, subtropical or tropical dry shrubland, Mediterranean-type shrubby vegetation, subtropical or tropical high-elevation grassland, and rocky areas.
