= East African highland shrew =

Conservation status
- Least Concern (IUCN 3.1)

Scientific classification
- Kingdom: Animalia
- Phylum: Chordata
- Class: Mammalia
- Order: Eulipotyphla
- Family: Soricidae
- Genus: Crocidura
- Species: C. allex

Binomial name
- Crocidura allex Osgood, 1910
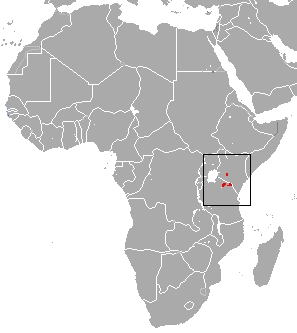
- East African highland shrew range

Species of mammal

The East African highland shrew (Crocidura allex) is a species of mammal in the family Soricidae. It is found in Kenya and Tanzania. Its natural habitats are subtropical or tropical moist montane forests, high-elevation grassland, and swamps.
