= Buettikofer's shrew =

Conservation status
- Least Concern (IUCN 3.1)

Scientific classification
- Kingdom: Animalia
- Phylum: Chordata
- Class: Mammalia
- Order: Eulipotyphla
- Family: Soricidae
- Genus: Crocidura
- Species: C. buettikoferi

Binomial name
- Crocidura buettikoferi Jentink, 1888
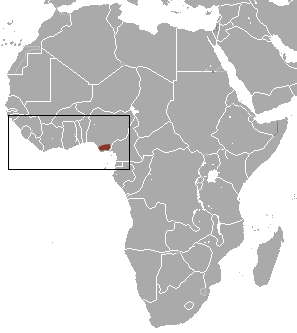
- Buettikofer's shrew range

Species of shrew

Buettikofer's shrew (Crocidura buettikoferi) is a species of mammal in the family Soricidae. It is found in southern Nigeria and scantly present in Ivory Coast, Ghana, Guinea, Liberia and Sierra Leone. Its natural habitat is subtropical or tropical moist lowland forests.
