= Eisentraut's shrew =

Conservation status
- Vulnerable (IUCN 3.1)

Scientific classification
- Kingdom: Animalia
- Phylum: Chordata
- Class: Mammalia
- Order: Eulipotyphla
- Family: Soricidae
- Genus: Crocidura
- Species: C. eisentrauti

Binomial name
- Crocidura eisentrauti Heim de Balsac, 1957
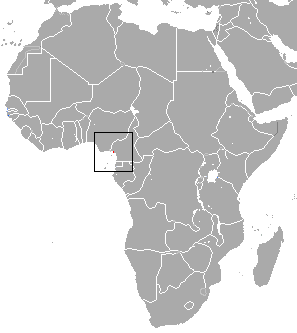
- Eisentraut's shrew range

Species of mammal

Eisentraut's shrew (Crocidura eisentrauti) is a species of mammal in the family Soricidae. It is endemic to Cameroon. Its natural habitat is subtropical or tropical high-elevation grassland.
