= Negev shrew =

Conservation status
- Least Concern (IUCN 3.1)

Scientific classification
- Kingdom: Animalia
- Phylum: Chordata
- Class: Mammalia
- Order: Eulipotyphla
- Family: Soricidae
- Genus: Crocidura
- Species: C. ramona

Binomial name
- Crocidura ramona Ivanitskaya, Shenbrot & Nevo, 1996
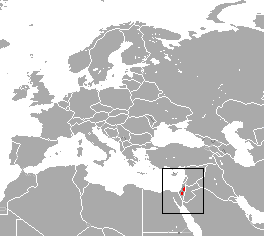
- Known range of the Negev shrew

Species of mammal

The Negev shrew (Crocidura ramona), also known as the Ramon's shrew (Hebrew: חדף הרמון, ḥadaf haramon) is a species of mammal in the family Soricidae. So far, it is only known from Israel. It is found in three regions: Mizpe Ramon and Sede Boqer in the Negev Desert, and Sartaber at the northern edge of the Judean Desert. It is likely that the species occurs more widely in the region than currently known (i.e., in Jordan, where similar habitats and Crocidura species have not been well surveyed). The three locations in which the species occurs are rocky desert areas at altitudes between 200 and 950 metres above sea level. The Negev shrew is light gray with a slightly lighter underpart. It is also relatively small.

Only seven specimens have been collected. The Negev shrew is likely to be more widespread in the region than currently known and there are no known threats at present. More data on range population densities and trends, and potential threats would be useful for a future reassessment, but it is currently assessed as Least Concern. Of the six known localities, this species has been found in five protected areas.

The Negev shrew is found either in or near to dry riverbeds with Retama and Tamarix vegetation or near to dry riverbeds with dense Atriplex vegetation. During surveys no other Crocidura species were found to be co-occurring with C. ramona, the only other shrew which it was found together with was Suncus etruscus. From 1999 to 2006 no specimens have been found; this is likely to be due to poor precipitation leading perhaps to lower populations and/or making the species more difficult to capture as it enters deeper soil layers. It is a naturally rare habitat specialist.
