= Crocidura mediocris =

Conservation status
- Least Concern (IUCN 3.1)

Scientific classification
- Kingdom: Animalia
- Phylum: Chordata
- Class: Mammalia
- Order: Eulipotyphla
- Family: Soricidae
- Genus: Crocidura
- Species: C. mediocris

Binomial name
- Crocidura mediocris Esselstyn, Achmadi, Handika, Swanson, Giarla, & Rowe, 2021

Species of shrew

Crocidura mediocris, the central Sulawesi white-toothed shrew, is a species of white-toothed shrew endemic to Sulawesi, Indonesia.
