= Makwassie musk shrew =

Conservation status
- Least Concern (IUCN 3.1)

Scientific classification
- Kingdom: Animalia
- Phylum: Chordata
- Class: Mammalia
- Order: Eulipotyphla
- Family: Soricidae
- Genus: Crocidura
- Species: C. maquassiensis

Binomial name
- Crocidura maquassiensis Roberts, 1946
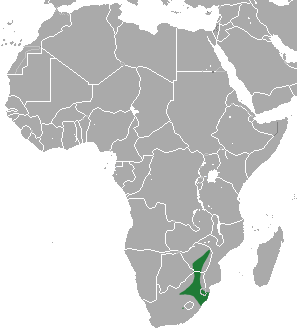
- Makwassie musk shrew range

Species of mammal

The Makwassie musk shrew (Crocidura maquassiensis) is a species of mammal in the family Soricidae. It is found in South Africa, Eswatini, and Zimbabwe. Its natural habitat is rocky areas.
