= Crocidura balingka =

Scientific classification
- Kingdom: Animalia
- Phylum: Chordata
- Class: Mammalia
- Order: Eulipotyphla
- Family: Soricidae
- Genus: Crocidura
- Species: C. balingka

Binomial name
- Crocidura balingka Nations et al., 2024

Species of shrew

Crocidura balingka, the Balingka white-toothed shrew, is a species of shrew in the genus Crocidura known from Mount Singgalang on Sumatra, where it occurs only above 2,000 metres (6,600 ft). It is named after the people of the village of Balingka in Agam Regency for their assistance to biologists studying the local fauna. The species was first described in 2024 by a team of scientists from the United States and Indonesia. DNA evidence indicates that it is most closely related to Crocidura dewi, another Mount Singgalang endemic, and to Crocidura aequicauda, which is from another mountain on Sumatra.

At a weight of 4.1 to 6.5 grams (0.14 to 0.23 oz), Crocidura balingka is a relatively small shrew, smaller than its close relative C. dewi. The fur is dark gray-brown on the back and slightly lighter on the lower side of the body. The feet and ears are darker than in other comparably sized Sumatran shrews.

== See also ==
- List of living mammal species described in the 2020s
