= Savanna shrew =

Conservation status
- Least Concern (IUCN 3.1)

Scientific classification
- Kingdom: Animalia
- Phylum: Chordata
- Class: Mammalia
- Order: Eulipotyphla
- Family: Soricidae
- Genus: Crocidura
- Species: C. fulvastra

Binomial name
- Crocidura fulvastra (Sundevall, 1843)
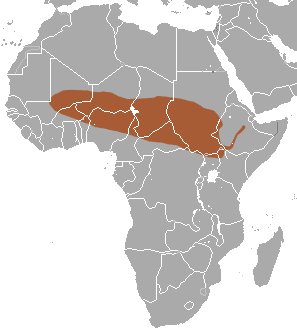
- Savanna shrew range

Species of mammal

The savanna shrew (Crocidura fulvastra) is a species of mammal in the family Soricidae. It is found in Benin, Burkina Faso, Cameroon, Central African Republic, Chad, Democratic Republic of the Congo, Djibouti, Eritrea, Ethiopia, Kenya, Mali, Mauritania, Niger, Nigeria, Sudan, and Uganda. Its natural habitat is dry savanna.
