= Heather shrew =

Conservation status
- Data Deficient (IUCN 3.1)

Scientific classification
- Kingdom: Animalia
- Phylum: Chordata
- Class: Mammalia
- Order: Eulipotyphla
- Family: Soricidae
- Genus: Crocidura
- Species: C. erica

Binomial name
- Crocidura erica Dollman, 1915
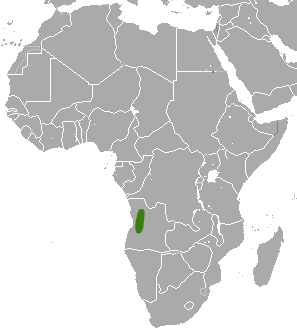
- Heather shrew range

Species of mammal

The heather shrew (Crocidura erica) is a species of mammal in the family Soricidae. It is endemic to Angola.
