= Roosevelt's shrew =

Conservation status
- Least Concern (IUCN 3.1)

Scientific classification
- Kingdom: Animalia
- Phylum: Chordata
- Class: Mammalia
- Order: Eulipotyphla
- Family: Soricidae
- Genus: Crocidura
- Species: C. roosevelti

Binomial name
- Crocidura roosevelti (Heller, 1910)
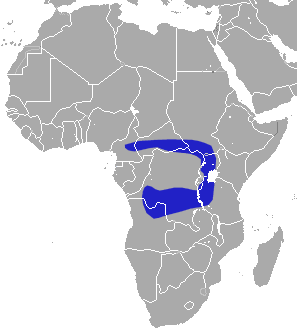
- Roosevelt's shrew range

Species of mammal

Roosevelt's shrew (Crocidura roosevelti) is a species of mammal in the family Soricidae. It is found in Angola, Cameroon, Central African Republic, Democratic Republic of the Congo, Rwanda, Tanzania, and Uganda. Its natural habitat is moist savanna.
