= Timor shrew =

Conservation status
- Data Deficient (IUCN 3.1)

Scientific classification
- Kingdom: Animalia
- Phylum: Chordata
- Class: Mammalia
- Infraclass: Placentalia
- Order: Eulipotyphla
- Family: Soricidae
- Genus: Crocidura
- Species: C. tenuis

Binomial name
- Crocidura tenuis (Müller, 1840)
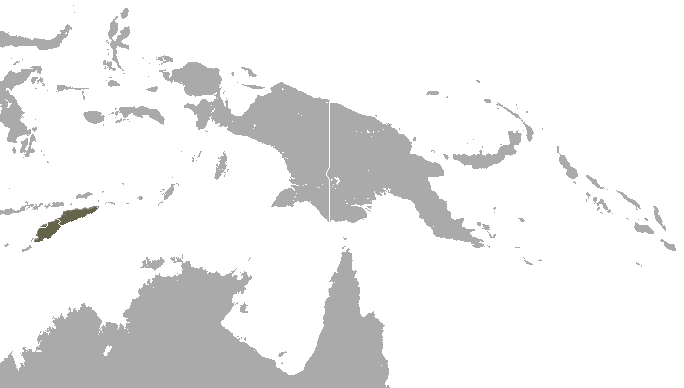
- Timor shrew range

Species of rodent

The Timor shrew or thin shrew (Crocidura tenuis) is a species of mammal in the family Soricidae. It is endemic to Timor.
