= Polia's shrew =

Conservation status
- Data Deficient (IUCN 3.1)

Scientific classification
- Kingdom: Animalia
- Phylum: Chordata
- Class: Mammalia
- Order: Eulipotyphla
- Family: Soricidae
- Genus: Crocidura
- Species: C. polia

Binomial name
- Crocidura polia Hollister, 1916
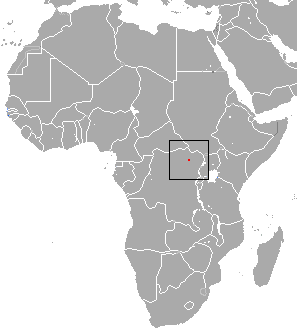
- Polia's shrew range

Species of mammal

Polia's shrew (Crocidura polia) is a species of mammal in the family Soricidae. It is endemic to Democratic Republic of the Congo.
