= African dusky shrew =

Conservation status
- Least Concern (IUCN 3.1)

Scientific classification
- Kingdom: Animalia
- Phylum: Chordata
- Class: Mammalia
- Order: Eulipotyphla
- Family: Soricidae
- Genus: Crocidura
- Species: C. caliginea

Binomial name
- Crocidura caliginea Hollister, 1916
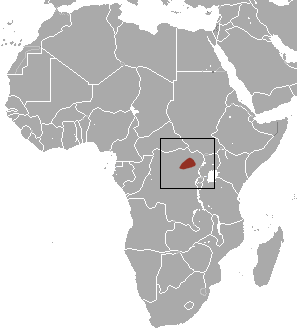
- African dusky shrew range

Species of mammal

The African dusky shrew or African foggy shrew (Crocidura caliginea) is a species of shrew. It is native to the Democratic Republic of the Congo, where it lives in forests.
