= Ansell's shrew =

Conservation status
- Endangered (IUCN 3.1)

Scientific classification
- Kingdom: Animalia
- Phylum: Chordata
- Class: Mammalia
- Order: Eulipotyphla
- Family: Soricidae
- Genus: Crocidura
- Species: C. ansellorum

Binomial name
- Crocidura ansellorum Hutterer & Dippenaar, 1987
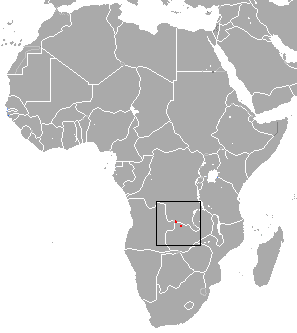
- Ansell's shrew range

Species of mammal

Ansell's shrew (Crocidura ansellorum) is a species of mammal in the family Soricidae. It is endemic to Zambia. Its natural habitat is subtropical or tropical moist lowland forests. It is threatened by habitat loss.
