= Sahelian tiny shrew =

Conservation status
- Least Concern (IUCN 3.1)

Scientific classification
- Kingdom: Animalia
- Phylum: Chordata
- Class: Mammalia
- Order: Eulipotyphla
- Family: Soricidae
- Genus: Crocidura
- Species: C. pasha

Binomial name
- Crocidura pasha Dollman, 1915
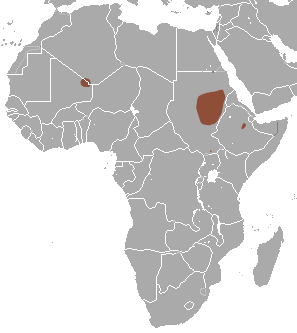
- Sahelian tiny shrew range

Species of mammal

The Sahelian tiny shrew (Crocidura pasha) is a species of mammal in the family Soricidae. It is found in Ethiopia and Sudan. Its natural habitat is dry Sahel savanna.
