= Tarella shrew =

Conservation status
- Endangered (IUCN 3.1)

Scientific classification
- Kingdom: Animalia
- Phylum: Chordata
- Class: Mammalia
- Order: Eulipotyphla
- Family: Soricidae
- Genus: Crocidura
- Species: C. tarella

Binomial name
- Crocidura tarella Dollman, 1915
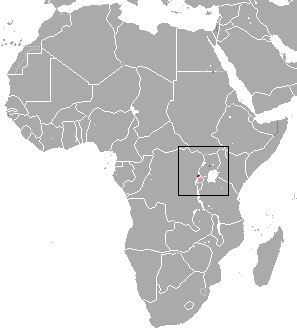
- Tarella shrew range

Species of mammal

The tarella shrew (Crocidura tarella) is a species of mammal in the family Soricidae. It is found in Democratic Republic of the Congo and Uganda. Its natural habitats are subtropical or tropical moist lowland forest and montane forest.
