= Kivu long-haired shrew =

Conservation status
- Vulnerable (IUCN 3.1)

Scientific classification
- Kingdom: Animalia
- Phylum: Chordata
- Class: Mammalia
- Order: Eulipotyphla
- Family: Soricidae
- Genus: Crocidura
- Species: C. lanosa

Binomial name
- Crocidura lanosa Balsac, 1968
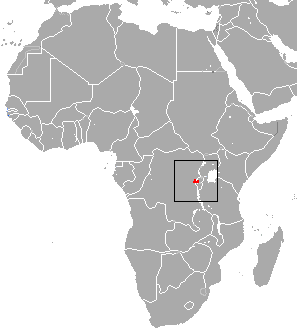
- Kivu long-haired shrew range

Species of mammal

The Kivu long-haired shrew (Crocidura lanosa) is a species of mammal in the family Soricidae. It is found in the Democratic Republic of the Congo and Rwanda. Its natural habitats are subtropical or tropical moist montane forests and swamps.
