= Javanese shrew =

Conservation status
- Least Concern (IUCN 3.1)

Scientific classification
- Kingdom: Animalia
- Phylum: Chordata
- Class: Mammalia
- Order: Eulipotyphla
- Family: Soricidae
- Genus: Crocidura
- Species: C. maxi

Binomial name
- Crocidura maxi Sody, 1936
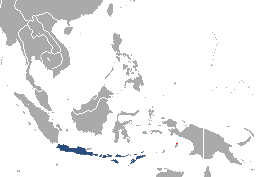
- Javanese shrew range

Species of mammal

The Javanese shrew (Crocidura maxi) is a species of mammal in the family Soricidae. It is native to Indonesia and Timor-Leste. It ranges throughout Java and the Lesser Sunda Islands. It has also been introduced to Ambon Island and the Aru Islands.
