= West African pygmy shrew =

Conservation status
- Least Concern (IUCN 3.1)

Scientific classification
- Kingdom: Animalia
- Phylum: Chordata
- Class: Mammalia
- Order: Eulipotyphla
- Family: Soricidae
- Genus: Crocidura
- Species: C. obscurior

Binomial name
- Crocidura obscurior Balsac, 1958
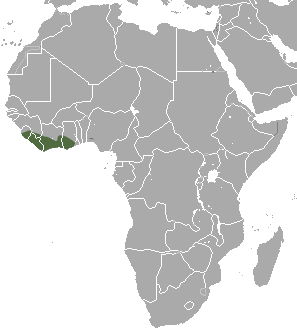
- West African pygmy shrew range

Species of mammal

The West African pygmy shrew or obscure white-toothed shrew (Crocidura obscurior) is a species of mammal in the family Soricidae. It is found in Ivory Coast, Ghana, Guinea, Liberia, and Sierra Leone. Its natural habitat is subtropical or tropical moist lowland forests.

The Ivory Coast white-toothed shrew (C. eburnea), which is sympatric with C. obscurior in Ivory Coast, Liberia & Guinea, and closely resembles it aside from having a longer skull, was considered conspecific with C. obscurior until a 2014 study delineated both as being genetically distinct sister species to one another.
