= Sokolov's shrew =

Conservation status
- Near Threatened (IUCN 3.1)

Scientific classification
- Kingdom: Animalia
- Phylum: Chordata
- Class: Mammalia
- Order: Eulipotyphla
- Family: Soricidae
- Genus: Crocidura
- Species: C. sokolovi

Binomial name
- Crocidura sokolovi Jenkins, Abramov, Rozhnov, & Makarova, 2007

Species of mammal

Sokolov's shrew (Crocidura sokolovi) is a species of mammal in the family Soricidae. It is endemic to Vietnam.

== Description ==
C. sokolovi is an intermediate species of Crocidura with a long tail that is thickened at the base and covered with coarse hairs. Long, soft, dense wool everywhere on the body is grayish-brown in color. The upper jaw is relatively narrow. The first incisor in the upper jaw is quite small. Head and body length 70 to 78 (average 72.67) mm, tail length 65 to 68 (66) mm, hind foot 14 mm long for all specimens, and skull length 18.8 to 20.36 (19.6) mm.

== Distribution ==
The species is restricted to Ngoc Linh mountain in the Vietnamese province of Kon Tum. This species is known from three males that were trapped by Alexei Abramov in April 2004 at 2,300–2,400 m (7,550–7,870 ft) above sea level in the forest on the western side of the mountain. This species is named after the late famous Russian zoologist Vladimir Sokolov (1928-1998). Along with Crocidura zaitsevi, this species is endemic to Ngoc Linh.
