= Fraser's musk shrew =

Conservation status
- Least Concern (IUCN 3.1)

Scientific classification
- Kingdom: Animalia
- Phylum: Chordata
- Class: Mammalia
- Order: Eulipotyphla
- Family: Soricidae
- Genus: Crocidura
- Species: C. poensis

Binomial name
- Crocidura poensis (Fraser, 1843)
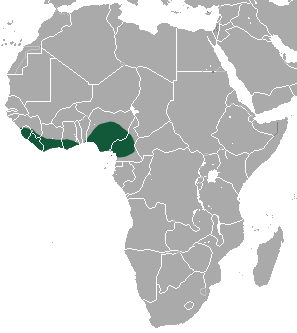
- Fraser's musk shrew range

Species of mammal

Fraser's musk shrew (Crocidura poensis) is a species of mammal in the family Soricidae. It is found in Benin, Cameroon, Ivory Coast, Equatorial Guinea, Ghana, Guinea, Liberia, Nigeria, São Tomé and Príncipe, Sierra Leone, and Togo. Its natural habitat is subtropical or tropical moist lowland forests. This large black shrew was first described by the British zoologist Louis Fraser in 1843. Its exact definition is unclear; the karyotype comes from Ivory Coast but not from Equatorial Guinea, which is given as the type locality.

== Distribution and habitat ==
Fraser's musk shrew is native to tropical western and central Africa. Its range extends from Guinea, Sierra Leone and Liberia through Ivory Coast, Ghana and Nigeria to Cameroon. Its range may extend further to the east than Cameroon because there is some confusion between its range and that of the very similar Bates's shrew (Crocidura batesi), a species which is found in Cameroon, Republic of the Congo, Equatorial Guinea and Gabon. Fraser's musk shrew is also present on the islands of São Tomé and Príncipe, located in the Gulf of Guinea. Its altitudinal range is between sea level and a few hundred metres. It typically occurs in primary forest and forest remnants, but has also been recorded from grasslands, grass clearings, savannah and farm bush.

== Status ==
Fraser's musk shrew is a little known but locally common species with a wide range and a presumed large total population. No particular threats have been recognised and it is able to some extent to adapt to habitats disturbed by man. For these reasons, the International Union for Conservation of Nature has assessed its conservation status as being of "least concern".
