= Jackass shrew =

Conservation status
- Least Concern (IUCN 3.1)

Scientific classification
- Kingdom: Animalia
- Phylum: Chordata
- Class: Mammalia
- Order: Eulipotyphla
- Family: Soricidae
- Genus: Crocidura
- Species: C. arispa

Binomial name
- Crocidura arispa Spitzenberger, 1971
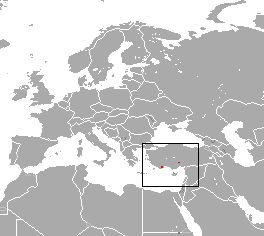
- Jackass shrew range

Species of mammal

The jackass shrew (Crocidura arispa) is a species of mammal belonging to the Soricidae family. It is endemic to Turkey. Its natural habitat is rocky areas.
