= Sumatran long-tailed shrew =

Conservation status
- Least Concern (IUCN 3.1)

Scientific classification
- Kingdom: Animalia
- Phylum: Chordata
- Class: Mammalia
- Order: Eulipotyphla
- Family: Soricidae
- Genus: Crocidura
- Species: C. paradoxura

Binomial name
- Crocidura paradoxura Dobson, 1886
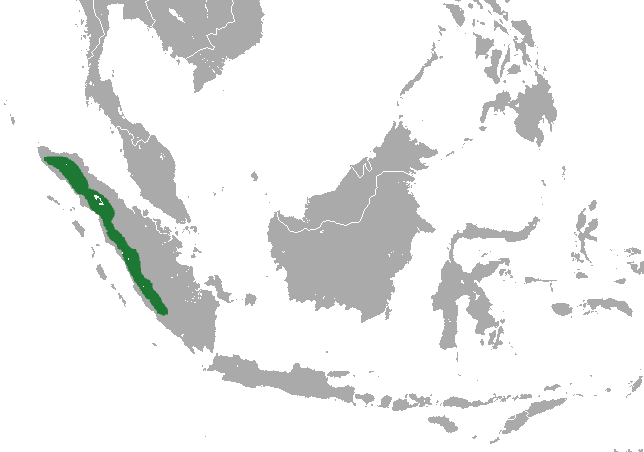
- Sumatran long-tailed shrew range

Species of mammal

The Sumatran long-tailed shrew (Crocidura paradoxura) is a species of mammal in the family Soricidae. It is endemic to Indonesia.
