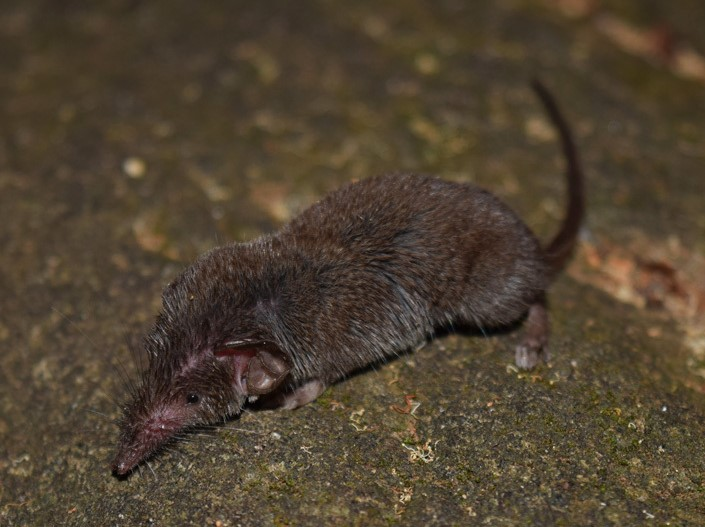

Conservation status
- Data Deficient (IUCN 3.1)

Scientific classification
- Kingdom: Animalia
- Phylum: Chordata
- Class: Mammalia
- Order: Eulipotyphla
- Family: Soricidae
- Genus: Crocidura
- Species: C. horsfieldii

Binomial name
- Crocidura horsfieldii (Tomes, 1856)
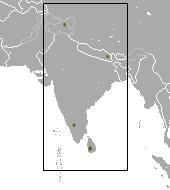
- Horsfield's shrew range

= Horsfield's shrew =

Species of mammal

Horsfield's shrew (Crocidura horsfieldii) is a species of mammal in the family Soricidae. It is found in Cambodia, China, India, Japan, Laos, Nepal, Bhutan, Sri Lanka, Taiwan, Thailand, and Vietnam.

== Description ==
Its head and body length is 6–7 cm (2.4–2.8 in), and the tail is 5–6 cm (2.0–2.4 in) long. Its coloration is dusky brown above and dusky gray below. It differs from the pygmy shrew by larger size and blackish feet.
