= Somali dwarf shrew =

Conservation status
- Data Deficient (IUCN 3.1)

Scientific classification
- Kingdom: Animalia
- Phylum: Chordata
- Class: Mammalia
- Order: Eulipotyphla
- Family: Soricidae
- Genus: Crocidura
- Species: C. nana

Binomial name
- Crocidura nana Dobson, 1890
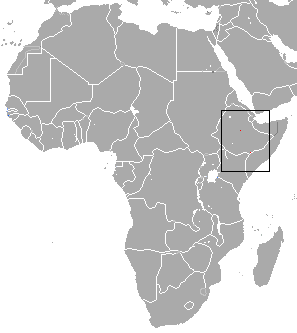
- Somali dwarf shrew range

Species of mammal

The Somali dwarf shrew (Crocidura nana) is a species of mammal in the family Soricidae. It is found in Ethiopia and Somalia. Its natural habitat is subtropical or tropical dry lowland grassland.

Type Locality: Somalia, Dollo

== Sources ==
- Don E. Wilson & DeeAnn M. Reeder (editors). 2005. Crocidura nana. Mammal Species of the World. A Taxonomic and Geographic Reference (3rd ed), Johns Hopkins University Press, 2,142 pp. (Available from Johns Hopkins University Press, 1-800-537-5487 or (410) 516-6900, or at http://www.press.jhu.edu).
