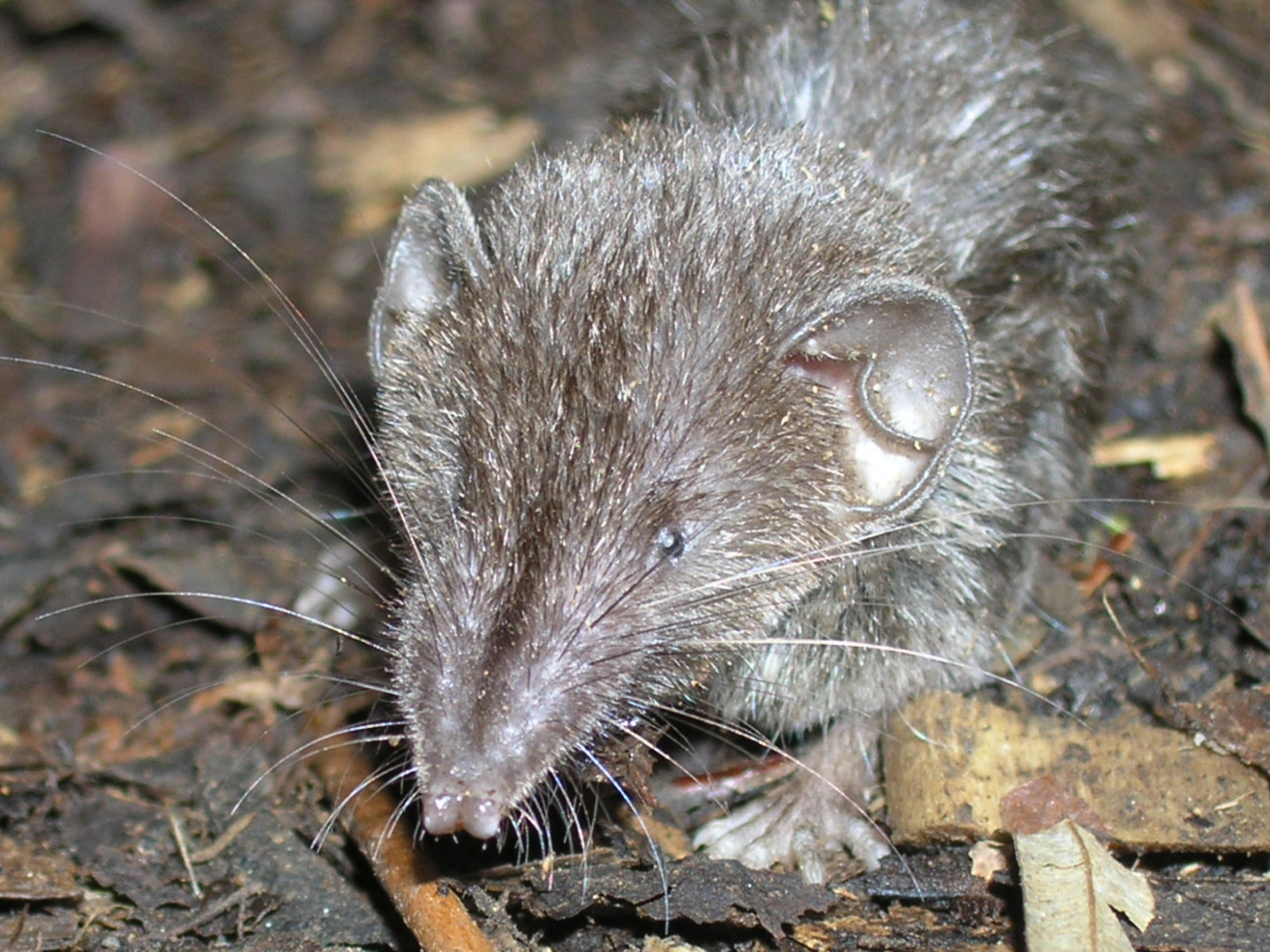

Conservation status
- Least Concern (IUCN 3.1)

Scientific classification
- Kingdom: Animalia
- Phylum: Chordata
- Class: Mammalia
- Order: Eulipotyphla
- Family: Soricidae
- Genus: Crocidura
- Species: C. beatus

Binomial name
- Crocidura beatus Miller, 1910
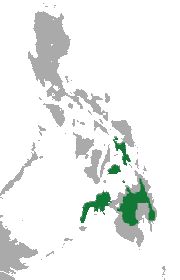
- Mindanao shrew range

= Mindanao shrew =

Species of mammal

The Mindanao shrew (Crocidura beatus) is a species of mammal in the family Soricidae. It is endemic to the Philippines. Its natural habitat is subtropical or tropical dry forests.
