= MacArthur's shrew =

Conservation status
- Least Concern (IUCN 3.1)

Scientific classification
- Kingdom: Animalia
- Phylum: Chordata
- Class: Mammalia
- Order: Eulipotyphla
- Family: Soricidae
- Genus: Crocidura
- Species: C. macarthuri

Binomial name
- Crocidura macarthuri St. Leger, 1934
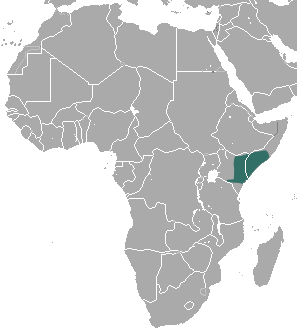
- MacArthur's shrew range

Species of mammal

MacArthur's shrew (Crocidura macarthuri) is a species of mammal in the family Soricidae. It is found in Kenya and Somalia. Its natural habitat is dry savanna.
