= Bottego's shrew =

Conservation status
- Data Deficient (IUCN 3.1)

Scientific classification
- Kingdom: Animalia
- Phylum: Chordata
- Class: Mammalia
- Infraclass: Placentalia
- Order: Eulipotyphla
- Family: Soricidae
- Genus: Crocidura
- Species: C. bottegi

Binomial name
- Crocidura bottegi Thomas, 1898
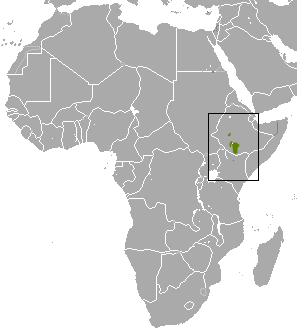
- Bottego's shrew range

Species of mammal

Bottego's shrew (Crocidura bottegi) is a species of mammal in the family Soricidae. It is found 1,750 metres (5,740 ft) above sea level in Ethiopia and possibly Kenya particularly northeast of Lake Turkana and once in Kenya from Marsabit.

== Sources ==
- Gerrie, R.; Kennerley, R. (2017) [errata version of 2016 assessment]. "Crocidura bottegi". IUCN Red List of Threatened Species. 2016 e.T40621A115175776. doi:10.2305/IUCN.UK.2016-3.RLTS.T40621A22295879.en.
