= Crocidura kegoensis =

Conservation status
- Least Concern (IUCN 3.1)

Scientific classification
- Kingdom: Animalia
- Phylum: Chordata
- Class: Mammalia
- Order: Eulipotyphla
- Family: Soricidae
- Genus: Crocidura
- Species: C. kegoensis

Binomial name
- Crocidura kegoensis Lunde, Musser, & T. Ziegler, 2004

Synonyms
- Crocidura zaitsevi Jenkins, Abramov, Rozhnov & Makarova, 2007

Species of mammal

Crocidura kegoensis, also known as the Ke Go shrew or Ke Go white-toothed shrew, is a species of shrew in the genus Crocidura described in 2004. It is smaller than other Crocidura species known from Vietnam, brownish-grey in colour with black markings on the muzzle. Its hair is short (hair on the back of 1.5 mm and 1.0 mm on the underside). The holotype was found in the Ke Go Nature Reserve, in Vietnam's Ha Tinh province, at an altitude of about 200 m (660 ft).

The holotype measurements are given below, all of which make it the smallest described Vietnamese species in its genus.

Head-body length	48 mm
Tail length	27 mm
Hind-foot length	10 mm
Ear length	5mm
