= Chinese white-toothed shrew =

Conservation status
- Data Deficient (IUCN 3.1)

Scientific classification
- Kingdom: Animalia
- Phylum: Chordata
- Class: Mammalia
- Order: Eulipotyphla
- Family: Soricidae
- Genus: Crocidura
- Species: C. rapax

Binomial name
- Crocidura rapax Allen, 1923

Species of mammal

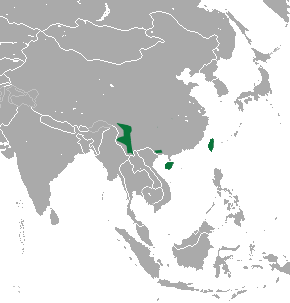
Chinese White-toothed Shrew (Crocidura rapax) range.

The Chinese white-toothed shrew (Crocidura rapax) is a species of mammal in the family Soricidae.

== Description ==
The Chinese white-toothed shrew is described as medium-sized with light brown dorsal fur and a faintly-colored dichromatic tail. Compared to Crocidura attenuata, its posterior upper premolars are not severely concave, exposing less bone material. The skull of Crocidura rapax is also longer than that of Crocidura indochinensis with a "proportionately broader maxillary to interorbital region but with a comparatively narrow braincase relative to skull length and maxillary breadth".
