= List of mammals of Angola =

This is a list of the mammal species recorded in Angola. Of the mammal species in Angola, one is critically endangered, five are endangered, eight are vulnerable, and ten are near threatened.

There are 291 extant species of mammals in Angola and 67 fossil species.

The following tags are used to highlight each species' conservation status as assessed by the International Union for Conservation of Nature:

EX	Extinct	No reasonable doubt that the last individual has died.
EW	Extinct in the wild	Known only to survive in captivity or as a naturalized populations well outside its previous range.
CR	Critically endangered	The species is in imminent risk of extinction in the wild.
EN	Endangered	The species is facing an extremely high risk of extinction in the wild.
VU	Vulnerable	The species is facing a high risk of extinction in the wild.
NT	Near threatened	The species does not meet any of the criteria that would categorise it as risking extinction but it is likely to do so in the future.
LC	Least concern	There are no current identifiable risks to the species.
DD	Data deficient	There is inadequate information to make an assessment of the risks to this species.

Some species were assessed using an earlier set of criteria. Species assessed using this system have the following instead of near threatened and least concern categories:

LR/cd	Lower risk/conservation dependent	Species which were the focus of conservation programmes and may have moved into a higher risk category if that programme was discontinued.
LR/nt	Lower risk/near threatened	Species which are close to being classified as vulnerable but are not the subject of conservation programmes.
LR/lc	Lower risk/least concern	Species for which there are no identifiable risks.

== Order: Afrosoricida (tenrecs and golden moles) ==
The order Afrosoricida contains the golden moles of southern Africa and the tenrecs of Madagascar and Africa, two families of small mammals that were traditionally part of the order Insectivora.

- Family: Tenrecidae (tenrecs)
  - Subfamily: Potamogalinae
    - Genus: Potamogale
      - Giant otter shrew, Potamogale velox LC
- Family: Chrysochloridae
  - Subfamily: Amblysominae
    - Genus: Calcochloris
      - Congo golden mole, Calcochloris leucorhinus DD

== Order: Macroscelidea (elephant shrews) ==
Often called sengi, the elephant shrews or jumping shrews are native to southern Africa. Their common English name derives from their elongated flexible snout and their resemblance to the true shrews.

- Family: Macroscelididae (elephant shrews)
  - Genus: Elephantulus
    - Short-snouted elephant shrew, Elephantulus brachyrhynchus LC
    - Bushveld elephant shrew, Elephantulus intufi LC
    - Western rock elephant shrew, Elephantulus rupestris LC
  - Genus: Petrodromus
    - Four-toed elephant shrew, Petrodromus tetradactylus LC

== Order: Tubulidentata (aardvarks) ==
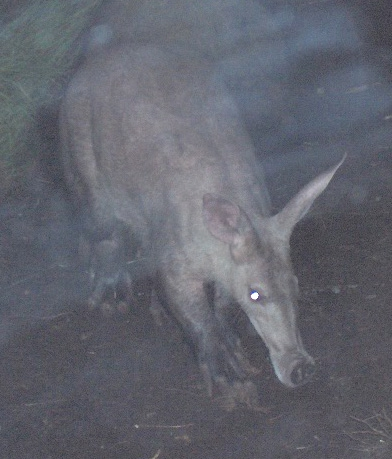
Aardvark

The order Tubulidentata consists of a single species, the aardvark. Tubulidentata are characterised by their teeth which lack a pulp cavity and form thin tubes which are continuously worn down and replaced.

- Family: Orycteropodidae
  - Genus: Orycteropus
    - Aardvark, O. afer LC

== Order: Hyracoidea (hyraxes) ==
The hyraxes are any of four species of fairly small, thickset, herbivorous mammals in the order Hyracoidea. About the size of a domestic cat they are well-furred, with rounded bodies and a stumpy tail. They are native to Africa and the Middle East.

- Family: Procaviidae (hyraxes)
  - Genus: Dendrohyrax
    - Southern tree hyrax, Dendrohyrax arboreus LC
  - Genus: Heterohyrax
    - Yellow-spotted rock hyrax, Heterohyrax brucei LC
  - Genus: Procavia
    - Cape hyrax, Procavia capensis LC

== Order: Proboscidea (elephants) ==
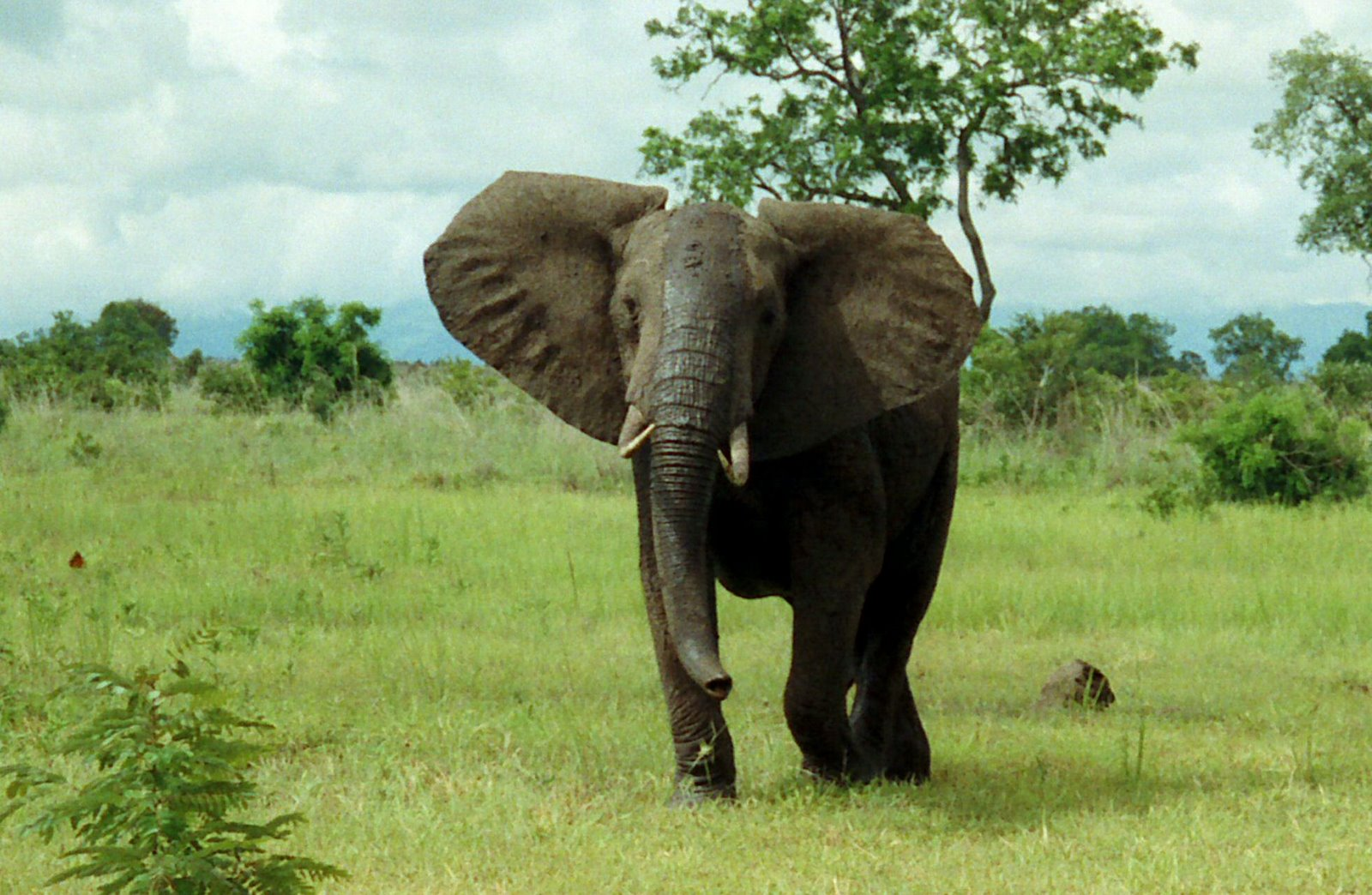
African bush elephant

The elephants comprise three living species and are the largest living land animals.

- Family: Elephantidae (elephants)
  - Genus: Loxodonta
    - African bush elephant, L. africana EN
    - African forest elephant, L. cyclotis CR

== Order: Sirenia (manatees and dugongs) ==
Sirenia is an order of fully aquatic, herbivorous mammals that inhabit rivers, estuaries, coastal marine waters, swamps, and marine wetlands. All four species are endangered.

- Family: Trichechidae
  - Genus: Trichechus
    - African manatee, Trichechus senegalensis VU

== Order: Primates ==
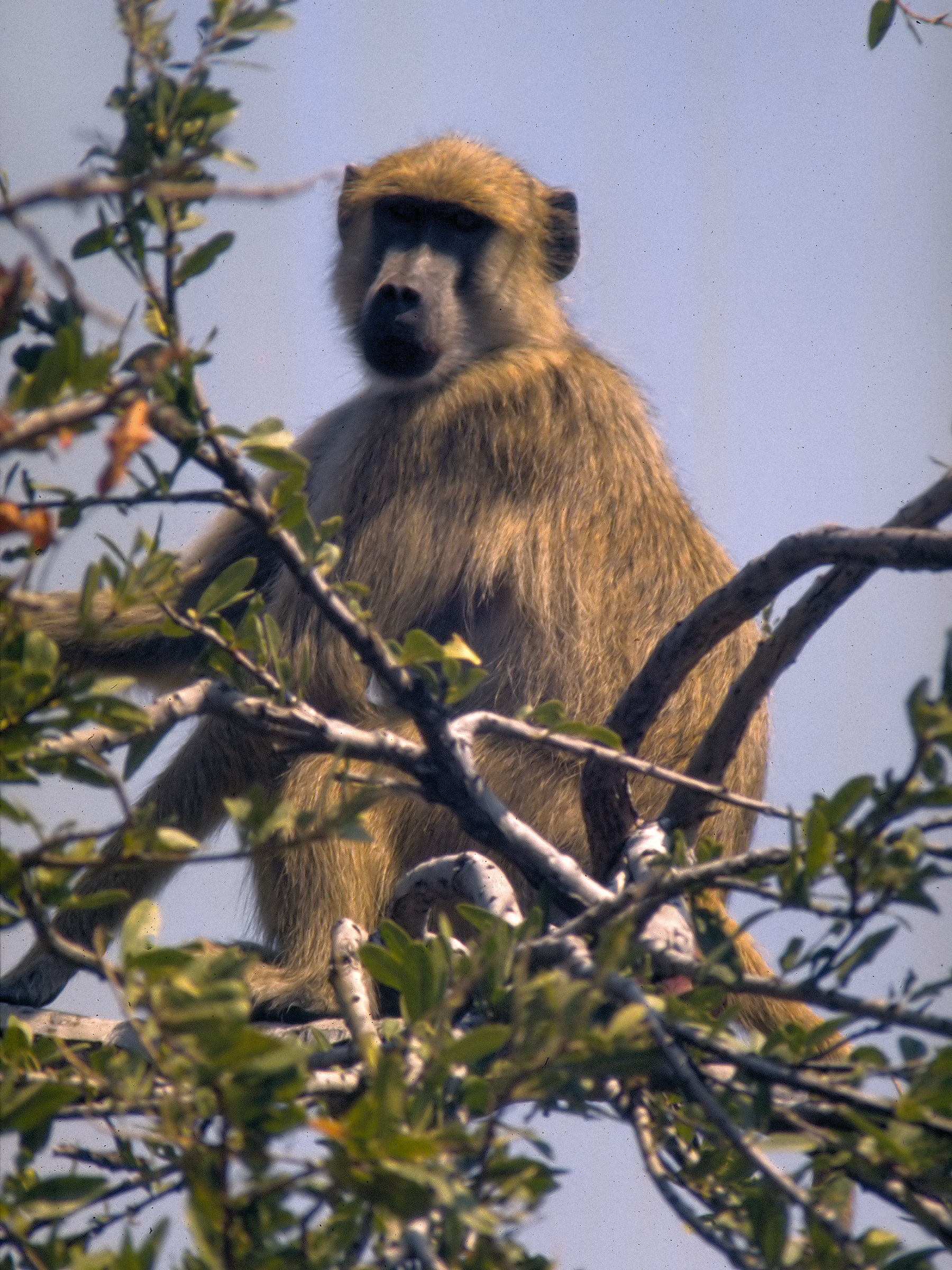
Chacma baboon

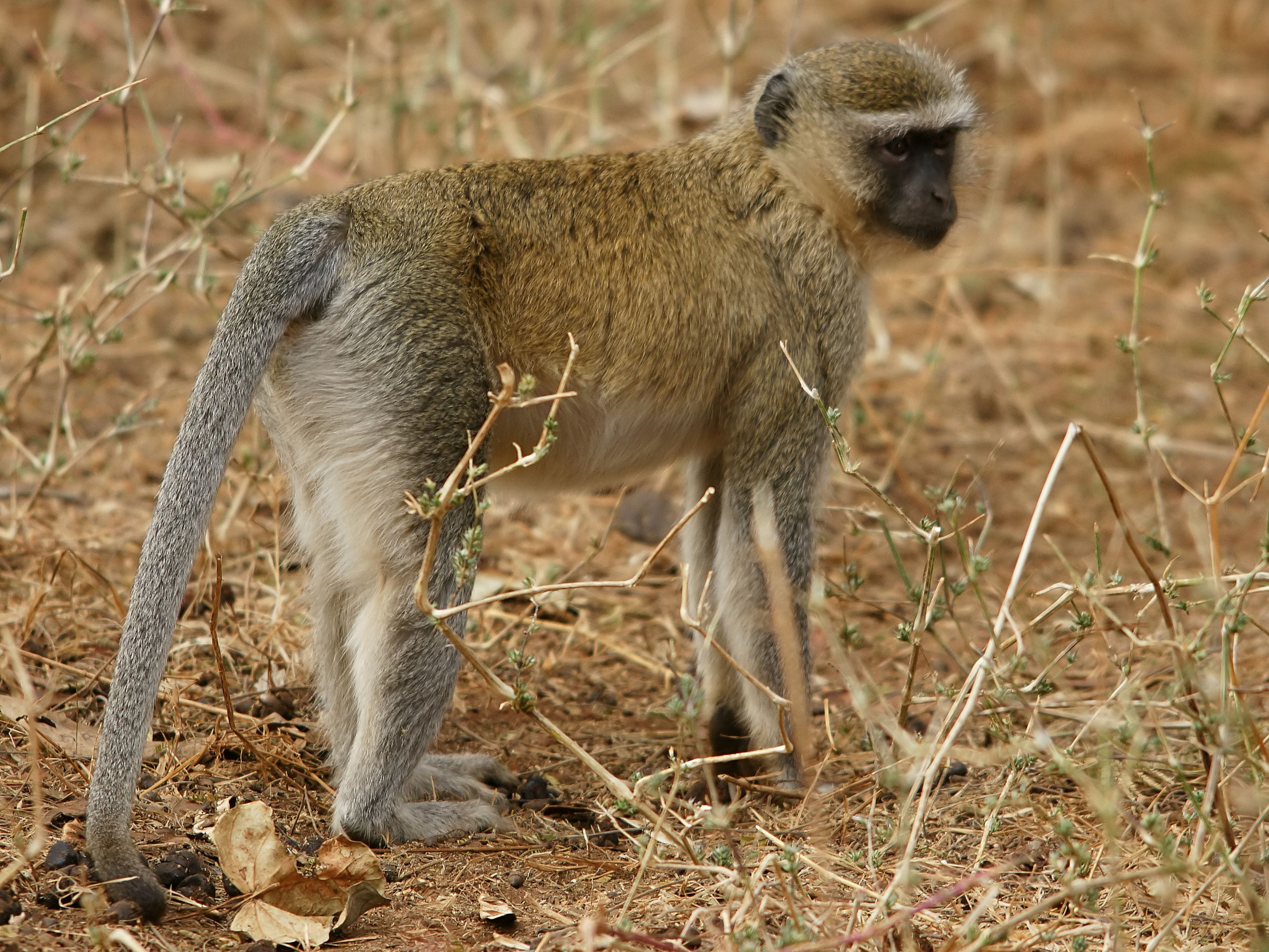
Malbrouck monkey

The order Primates contains humans and their closest relatives: lemurs, lorisoids, tarsiers, monkeys, and apes.

- Suborder: Strepsirrhini
  - Infraorder: Lemuriformes
    - Superfamily: Lorisoidea
      - Family: Lorisidae
        - Genus: Arctocebus
          - Golden angwantibo, Arctocebus aureus LR/nt
        - Genus: Perodicticus
          - Potto, Perodicticus potto LR/lc
      - Family: Galagidae
        - Genus: Sciurocheirus
          - Bioko Allen's bushbaby, Sciurocheirus alleni LR/nt
        - Genus: Galago
          - Mohol bushbaby, Galago moholi LR/lc
        - Genus: Galagoides
          - Prince Demidoff's bushbaby, Galagoides demidovii LR/lc
          - Thomas's bushbaby, Galagoides thomasi LR/lc
          - Angolan dwarf galago, Galagoides kumbirensis NT
        - Genus: Otolemur
          - Brown greater galago, Otolemur crassicaudatus LR/lc
        - Genus: Euoticus
          - Southern needle-clawed bushbaby, Euoticus elegantulus LR/nt
- Suborder: Haplorhini
  - Infraorder: Simiiformes
    - Parvorder: Catarrhini
      - Superfamily: Cercopithecoidea
        - Family: Cercopithecidae (Old World monkeys)
          - Genus: Allenopithecus
            - Allen's swamp monkey, Allenopithecus nigroviridis LR/nt
          - Genus: Miopithecus
            - Angolan talapoin, Miopithecus talapoin LR/lc
          - Genus: Chlorocebus
            - Malbrouck, Chlorocebus cynosuros LR/lc
          - Genus: Cercopithecus
            - Red-tailed monkey, Cercopithecus ascanius LR/lc
            - Moustached guenon, Cercopithecus cephus LR/lc
            - Blue monkey, Cercopithecus mitis LR/lc
            - De Brazza's monkey, Cercopithecus neglectus LR/lc
            - Greater spot-nosed monkey, Cercopithecus nictitans LR/lc
            - Crowned guenon, Cercopithecus pogonias LR/lc
          - Genus: Lophocebus
            - Grey-cheeked mangabey, Lophocebus albigena LR/lc
            - Black crested mangabey, Lophocebus aterrimus LR/nt
          - Genus: Papio
            - Yellow baboon, Papio cynocephalus LR/lc
            - Chacma baboon, Papio ursinus LR/lc
          - Subfamily: Colobinae
            - Genus: Colobus
              - Angola colobus, Colobus angolensis LR/lc
      - Superfamily: Hominoidea
        - Family: Hominidae
          - Subfamily: Homininae
            - Tribe: Gorillini
              - Genus: Gorilla
                - Western gorilla, Gorilla gorilla EN
            - Tribe: Panini
              - Genus: Pan
                - Common chimpanzee, Pan troglodytes EN

== Order: Rodentia (rodents) ==
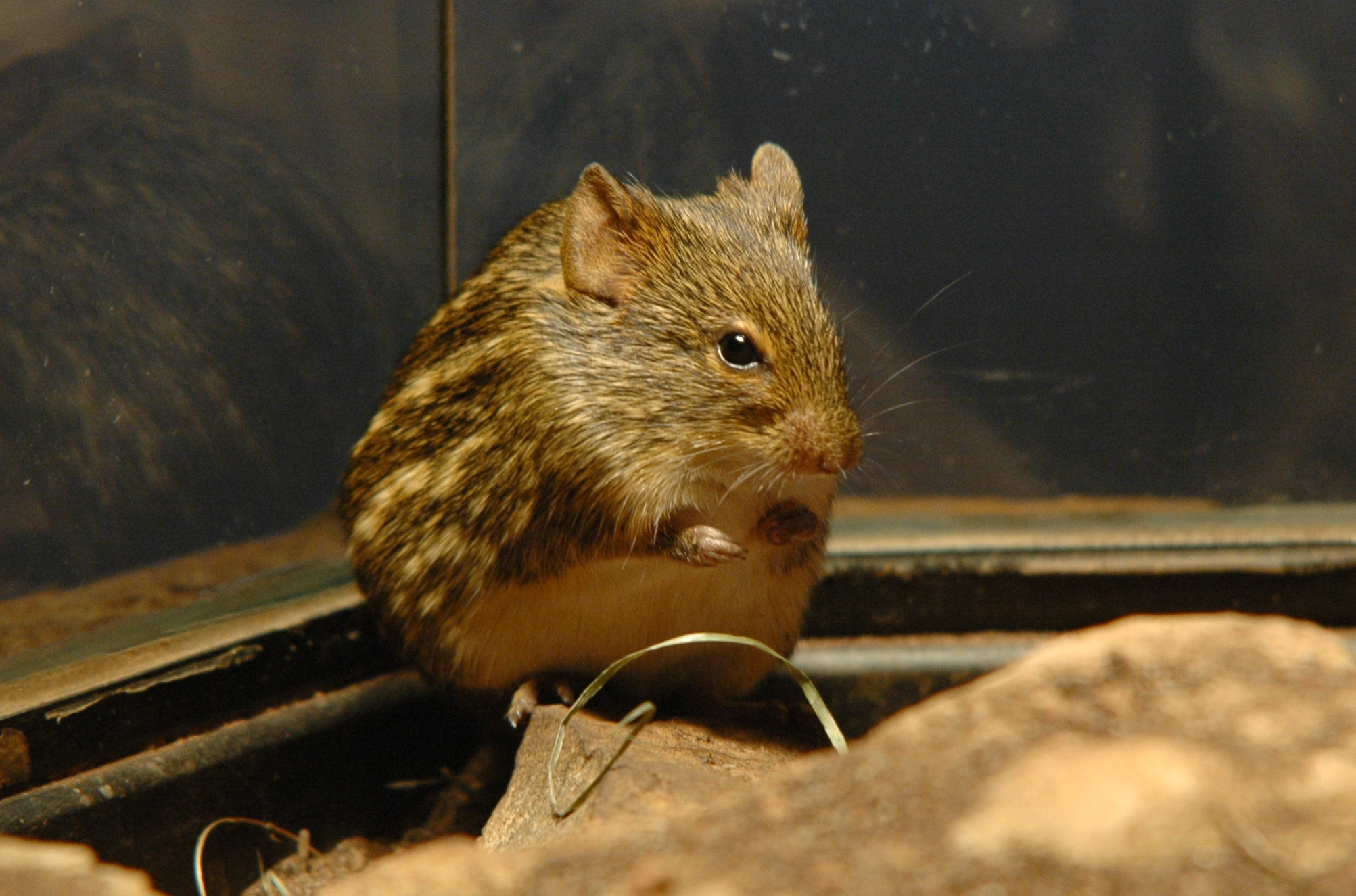
Typical striped grass mouse

Rodents make up the largest order of mammals, with over 40 percent of mammalian species. They have two incisors in the upper and lower jaw which grow continually and must be kept short by gnawing. Most rodents are small though the capybara can weigh up to 45 kg (100 lb).

- Suborder: Hystricomorpha
  - Family: Bathyergidae
    - Genus: Cryptomys
      - Bocage's mole-rat, Cryptomys bocagei DD
      - Damaraland mole-rat, Cryptomys damarensis LC
      - Mechow's mole-rat, Cryptomys mechowi LC
  - Family: Petromuridae
    - Genus: Petromus
      - Dassie rat, Petromus typicus LC
- Suborder: Sciurognathi
  - Family: Anomaluridae
    - Subfamily: Anomalurinae
      - Genus: Anomalurus
        - Lord Derby's scaly-tailed squirrel, Anomalurus derbianus LC
      - Genus: Anomalurops
        - Beecroft's scaly-tailed squirrel, Anomalurops beecrofti LC
  - Family: Pedetidae (spring hare)
    - Genus: Pedetes
      - Springhare, Pedetes capensis LC
  - Family: Sciuridae (squirrels)
    - Subfamily: Xerinae
      - Tribe: Xerini
        - Genus: Xerus
          - Mountain ground squirrel, Xerus princeps LC
      - Tribe: Protoxerini
        - Genus: Funisciurus
          - Lunda rope squirrel, Funisciurus bayonii DD
          - Congo rope squirrel, Funisciurus congicus LC
          - Fire-footed rope squirrel, Funisciurus pyrropus LC
        - Genus: Heliosciurus
          - Gambian sun squirrel, Heliosciurus gambianus LC
        - Genus: Paraxerus
          - Smith's bush squirrel, Paraxerus cepapi LC
        - Genus: Protoxerus
          - Forest giant squirrel, Protoxerus stangeri LC
  - Family: Gliridae (dormice)
    - Subfamily: Graphiurinae
      - Genus: Graphiurus
        - Angolan African dormouse, Graphiurus angolensis DD
        - Kellen's dormouse, Graphiurus kelleni DD
        - Small-eared dormouse, Graphiurus microtis LC
        - Monard's dormouse, Graphiurus monardi DD
        - Rock dormouse, Graphiurus platyops LC
        - Stone dormouse, Graphiurus rupicola LC
  - Family: Spalacidae
    - Subfamily: Tachyoryctinae
      - Genus: Tachyoryctes
        - Ankole African mole-rat, Tachyoryctes ankoliae
  - Family: Nesomyidae
    - Subfamily: Petromyscinae
      - Genus: Petromyscus
        - Pygmy rock mouse, Petromyscus collinus LC
        - Shortridge's rock mouse, Petromyscus shortridgei LC
    - Subfamily: Dendromurinae
      - Genus: Dendromus
        - Gray climbing mouse, Dendromus melanotis LC
        - Chestnut climbing mouse, Dendromus mystacalis LC
        - Nyika climbing mouse, Dendromus nyikae LC
        - Vernay's climbing mouse, Dendromus vernayi DD
      - Genus: Malacothrix
        - Gerbil mouse, Malacothrix typica LC
      - Genus: Steatomys
        - Kreb's fat mouse, Steatomys krebsii LC
        - Tiny fat mouse, Steatomys parvus LC
        - Fat mouse, Steatomys pratensis LC
    - Subfamily: Cricetomyinae
      - Genus: Cricetomys
        - Gambian pouched rat, Cricetomys gambianus LC
      - Genus: Saccostomus
        - South African pouched mouse, Saccostomus campestris LC
  - Family: Muridae (mice, rats, voles, gerbils, hamsters, etc.)
    - Subfamily: Deomyinae
      - Genus: Lophuromys
        - Yellow-spotted brush-furred rat, Lophuromys flavopunctatus LC
        - Rusty-bellied brush-furred rat, Lophuromys sikapusi LC
    - Subfamily: Otomyinae
      - Genus: Otomys
        - Angolan vlei rat, Otomys anchietae LC
        - Cuanza vlei rat, Otomys cuanzensis LC
        - Large vlei rat, Otomys maximus LC
    - Subfamily: Gerbillinae
      - Genus: Desmodillus
        - Cape short-eared gerbil, Desmodillus auricularis LC
      - Genus: Gerbillurus
        - Hairy-footed gerbil, Gerbillurus paeba LC
        - Namib brush-tailed gerbil, Gerbillurus setzeri LC
      - Genus: Tatera
        - Boehm's gerbil, Tatera boehmi LC
        - Highveld gerbil, Tatera brantsii LC
        - Bushveld gerbil, Tatera leucogaster LC
        - Savanna gerbil, Tatera valida LC
    - Subfamily: Murinae
      - Genus: Aethomys
        - Bocage's rock rat, Aethomys bocagei LC
        - Red rock rat, Aethomys chrysophilus LC
        - Kaiser's rock rat, Aethomys kaiseri LC
        - Namaqua rock rat, Aethomys namaquensis LC
        - Nyika rock rat, Aethomys nyikae LC
        - Thomas's rock rat, Aethomys thomasi LC
      - Genus: Colomys
        - African wading rat, Colomys goslingi LC
      - Genus: Dasymys
        - African marsh rat, Dasymys incomtus LC
        - Angolan marsh rat, Dasymys nudipes NT
      - Genus: Grammomys
        - Woodland thicket rat, Grammomys dolichurus LC
        - Shining thicket rat, Grammomys rutilans LC
      - Genus: Hybomys
        - Peters's striped mouse, Hybomys univittatus LC
      - Genus: Hylomyscus
        - Allen's wood mouse, Hylomyscus alleni LC
        - Angolan wood mouse, Hylomyscus carillus LC
        - Montane wood mouse, Hylomyscus denniae LC
      - Genus: Lemniscomys
        - Griselda's striped grass mouse, Lemniscomys griselda LC
        - Single-striped grass mouse, Lemniscomys rosalia LC
        - Rosevear's striped grass mouse, Lemniscomys roseveari DD
        - Typical striped grass mouse, Lemniscomys striatus LC
      - Genus: Malacomys
        - Big-eared swamp rat, Malacomys longipes LC
      - Genus: Mastomys
        - Southern multimammate mouse, Mastomys coucha LC
        - Natal multimammate mouse, Mastomys natalensis LC
        - Shortridge's multimammate mouse, Mastomys shortridgei LC
      - Genus: Mus
        - Callewaert's mouse, Mus callewaerti DD
        - Desert pygmy mouse, Mus indutus LC
        - African pygmy mouse, Mus minutoides LC
        - Thomas's pygmy mouse, Mus sorella LC
        - Gray-bellied pygmy mouse, Mus triton LC
      - Genus: Mylomys
        - African groove-toothed rat, Mylomys dybowskii LC
      - Genus: Myomyscus
        - Angolan multimammate mouse, Myomyscus angolensis LC
      - Genus: Oenomys
        - Common rufous-nosed rat, Oenomys hypoxanthus LC
      - Genus: Pelomys
        - Bell groove-toothed swamp rat, Pelomys campanae LC
        - Creek groove-toothed swamp rat, Pelomys fallax LC
        - Least groove-toothed swamp rat, Pelomys minor LC
      - Genus: Praomys
        - Jackson's soft-furred mouse, Praomys jacksoni LC
        - Tullberg's soft-furred mouse, Praomys tullbergi LC
      - Genus: Rhabdomys
        - Four-striped grass mouse, Rhabdomys pumilio LC
      - Genus: Thallomys
        - Black-tailed tree rat, Thallomys nigricauda LC
      - Genus: Zelotomys
        - Hildegarde's broad-headed mouse, Zelotomys hildegardeae LC
        - Woosnam's broad-headed mouse, Zelotomys woosnami LC

== Order: Lagomorpha (lagomorphs) ==
The lagomorphs comprise two families, Leporidae (hares and rabbits), and Ochotonidae (pikas). Though they can resemble rodents, and were classified as a superfamily in that order until the early 20th century, they have since been considered a separate order. They differ from rodents in a number of physical characteristics, such as having four incisors in the upper jaw rather than two.

- Family: Leporidae (rabbits, hares)
  - Genus: Poelagus
    - Bunyoro rabbit, Poelagus marjorita LR/lc
  - Genus: Pronolagus
    - Jameson's red rock hare, Pronolagus randensis LR/lc
  - Genus: Lepus
    - Cape hare, Lepus capensis LR/lc
    - African savanna hare, Lepus microtis LR/lc

== Order: Erinaceomorpha (hedgehogs and gymnures) ==
The order Erinaceomorpha contains a single family, Erinaceidae, which comprise the hedgehogs and gymnures. The hedgehogs are easily recognised by their spines while gymnures look more like large rats.

- Family: Erinaceidae (hedgehogs)
  - Subfamily: Erinaceinae
    - Genus: Atelerix
      - Southern African hedgehog, Atelerix frontalis LR/lc

== Order: Soricomorpha (shrews, moles, and solenodons) ==
The "shrew-forms" are insectivorous mammals. The shrews and solenodons closely resemble mice while the moles are stout-bodied burrowers.

- Family: Soricidae (shrews)
  - Subfamily: Crocidurinae
    - Genus: Crocidura
      - Reddish-gray musk shrew, Crocidura cyanea LC
      - Heather shrew, Crocidura erica DD
      - Bicolored musk shrew, Crocidura fuscomurina LC
      - Lesser red musk shrew, Crocidura hirta LC
      - Moonshine shrew, Crocidura luna LC
      - Swamp musk shrew, Crocidura mariquensis LC
      - Blackish white-toothed shrew, Crocidura nigricans LC
      - African black shrew, Crocidura nigrofusca LC
      - African giant shrew, Crocidura olivieri LC
      - Small-footed shrew, Crocidura parvipes LC
      - Roosvelt's shrew, Crocidura roosevelti LC
      - Lesser gray-brown musk shrew, Crocidura silacea LC
      - Turbo shrew, Crocidura turba LC
    - Genus: Suncus
      - Greater dwarf shrew, Suncus lixus LC
    - Genus: Sylvisorex
      - Climbing shrew, Sylvisorex megalura LC

== Order: Chiroptera (bats) ==
The bats' most distinguishing feature is that their forelimbs are developed as wings, making them the only mammals capable of flight. Bat species account for about 20% of all mammals.

- Family: Pteropodidae (flying foxes, Old World fruit bats)
  - Subfamily: Pteropodinae
    - Genus: Eidolon
      - Straw-coloured fruit bat, Eidolon helvum LC
    - Genus: Epomophorus
      - Angolan epauletted fruit bat, Epomophorus angolensis NT
      - Peters's epauletted fruit bat, Epomophorus crypturus LC
      - Lesser Angolan epauletted fruit bat, Epomophorus grandis DD
      - Wahlberg's epauletted fruit bat, Epomophorus wahlbergi LC
    - Genus: Epomops
      - Dobson's epauletted fruit bat, Epomops dobsoni LC
      - Franquet's epauletted fruit bat, Epomops franqueti LC
    - Genus: Hypsignathus
      - Hammer-headed bat, Hypsignathus monstrosus LC
    - Genus: Lissonycteris
      - Angolan rousette, Lissonycteris angolensis LC
    - Genus: Micropteropus
      - Hayman's dwarf epauletted fruit bat, Micropteropus intermedius DD
      - Peters's dwarf epauletted fruit bat, Micropteropus pusillus LC
    - Genus: Myonycteris
      - Little collared fruit bat, Myonycteris torquata LC
    - Genus: Plerotes
      - D'Anchieta's fruit bat, Plerotes anchietae DD
    - Genus: Rousettus
      - Egyptian fruit bat, Rousettus aegyptiacus LC
  - Subfamily: Macroglossinae
    - Genus: Megaloglossus
      - Woermann's bat, Megaloglossus woermanni LC
- Family: Vespertilionidae
  - Subfamily: Kerivoulinae
    - Genus: Kerivoula
      - Damara woolly bat, Kerivoula argentata LC
  - Subfamily: Myotinae
    - Genus: Cistugo
      - Angolan hairy bat, Cistugo seabrai NT
    - Genus: Myotis
      - Rufous mouse-eared bat, Myotis bocagii LC
      - Welwitsch's bat, Myotis welwitschii LC
  - Subfamily: Vespertilioninae
    - Genus: Glauconycteris
      - Silvered bat, Glauconycteris argentata LC
      - Beatrix's bat, Glauconycteris beatrix NT
      - Machado's butterfly bat, Glauconycteris machadoi DD
      - Butterfly bat, Glauconycteris variegata LC
    - Genus: Hypsugo
      - Anchieta's pipistrelle, Hypsugo anchietae LC
      - Broad-headed pipistrelle, Hypsugo crassulus LC
    - Genus: Laephotis
      - Angolan long-eared bat, Laephotis angolensis NT
    - Genus: Mimetillus
      - Moloney's mimic bat, Mimetillus moloneyi LC
    - Genus: Neoromicia
      - Cape serotine, Neoromicia capensis LC
      - Yellow serotine, Neoromicia flavescens DD
      - Banana pipistrelle, Neoromicia nanus LC
      - White-winged serotine, Neoromicia tenuipinnis LC
      - Zulu serotine, Neoromicia zuluensis LC
    - Genus: Nycticeinops
      - Schlieffen's bat, Nycticeinops schlieffeni LC
    - Genus: Pipistrellus
      - Rüppell's pipistrelle, Pipistrellus rueppelli LC
      - Rusty pipistrelle, Pipistrellus rusticus LC
    - Genus: Scotoecus
      - White-bellied lesser house bat, Scotoecus albigula DD
      - Dark-winged lesser house bat, Scotoecus hirundo DD
    - Genus: Scotophilus
      - White-bellied yellow bat, Scotophilus leucogaster LC
  - Subfamily: Miniopterinae
    - Genus: Miniopterus
      - Natal long-fingered bat, Miniopterus natalensis NT
- Family: Molossidae
  - Genus: Chaerephon
    - Ansorge's free-tailed bat, Chaerephon ansorgei LC
    - Nigerian free-tailed bat, Chaerephon nigeriae LC
    - Little free-tailed bat, Chaerephon pumila LC
  - Genus: Mops
    - Angolan free-tailed bat, Mops condylurus LC
    - White-bellied free-tailed bat, Mops niveiventer LC
  - Genus: Otomops
    - Large-eared free-tailed bat, Otomops martiensseni NT
  - Genus: Tadarida
    - Egyptian free-tailed bat, Tadarida aegyptiaca LC
- Family: Emballonuridae
  - Genus: Coleura
    - African sheath-tailed bat, Coleura afra LC
  - Genus: Saccolaimus
    - Pel's pouched bat, Saccolaimus peli NT
  - Genus: Taphozous
    - Mauritian tomb bat, Taphozous mauritianus LC
- Family: Nycteridae
  - Genus: Nycteris
    - Bate's slit-faced bat, Nycteris arge LC
    - Hairy slit-faced bat, Nycteris hispida LC
    - Intermediate slit-faced bat, Nycteris intermedia NT
    - Large-eared slit-faced bat, Nycteris macrotis LC
    - Dwarf slit-faced bat, Nycteris nana LC
    - Egyptian slit-faced bat, Nycteris thebaica LC
- Family: Rhinolophidae
  - Subfamily: Rhinolophinae
    - Genus: Rhinolophus
      - Geoffroy's horseshoe bat, Rhinolophus clivosus LC
      - Darling's horseshoe bat, Rhinolophus darlingi LC
      - Dent's horseshoe bat, Rhinolophus denti DD
      - Rüppell's horseshoe bat, Rhinolophus fumigatus LC
      - Lander's horseshoe bat, Rhinolophus landeri LC
      - Swinny's horseshoe bat, Rhinolophus swinnyi NT
  - Subfamily: Hipposiderinae
    - Genus: Hipposideros
      - Sundevall's roundleaf bat, Hipposideros caffer LC
      - Giant roundleaf bat, Hipposideros gigas LC
      - Noack's roundleaf bat, Hipposideros ruber LC
    - Genus: Triaenops
      - Persian trident bat, Triaenops persicus LC

== Order: Pholidota (pangolins) ==
The order Pholidota comprises the eight species of pangolin. Pangolins are anteaters and have the powerful claws, elongated snout and long tongue seen in the other unrelated anteater species.

- Family: Manidae
  - Genus: Manis
    - Giant pangolin, Manis gigantea LR/lc
    - Ground pangolin, Manis temminckii LR/nt
    - Long-tailed pangolin, Manis tetradactyla LR/lc
    - Tree pangolin, Manis tricuspis LR/lc

== Order: Cetacea (whales) ==
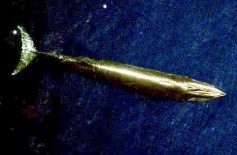
Bryde's whale

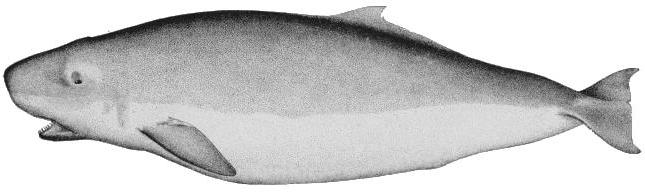
Pygmy sperm whale

The order Cetacea includes whales, dolphins and porpoises. They are the mammals most fully adapted to aquatic life with a spindle-shaped nearly hairless body, protected by a thick layer of blubber, and forelimbs and tail modified to provide propulsion underwater.

- Suborder: Mysticeti
  - Family: Balaenopteridae
    - Subfamily: Balaenopterinae
      - Genus: Balaenoptera
        - Common minke whale, Balaenoptera acutorostrata LC
        - Antarctic minke whale, Balaenoptera bonaerensis DD
        - Sei whale, Balaenoptera borealis EN
        - Bryde's whale, Balaenoptera edeni DD
        - Blue whale, Balaenoptera musculus EN
        - Fin whale, Balaenoptera physalus EN
    - Subfamily: Megapterinae
      - Genus: Megaptera
        - Humpback whale, Megaptera novaeangliae VU
  - Family: Balaenidae
    - Genus: Eubalaena
      - Southern right whale, Eubalaena australis LR/cd
- Suborder: Odontoceti
  - Superfamily: Platanistoidea
    - Family: Physeteridae
      - Genus: Physeter
        - Sperm whale, Physeter macrocephalus VU
    - Family: Kogiidae
      - Genus: Kogia
        - Pygmy sperm whale, Kogia breviceps LR/lc
        - Dwarf sperm whale, Kogia sima LR/lc
    - Family: Ziphidae
      - Subfamily: Hyperoodontinae
        - Genus: Mesoplodon
          - Blainville's beaked whale, Mesoplodon densirostris DD
          - Gray's beaked whale, Mesoplodon grayi DD
        - Genus: Ziphius
          - Cuvier's beaked whale, Ziphius cavirostris DD
    - Family: Delphinidae (marine dolphins)
      - Genus: Cephalorhynchus
        - Heaviside's dolphin, Cephalorhynchus heavisidii DD
      - Genus: Steno
        - Rough-toothed dolphin, Steno bredanensis DD
      - Genus: Tursiops
        - Common bottlenose dolphin, Tursiops truncatus DD
      - Genus: Stenella
        - Pantropical spotted dolphin, Stenella attenuata LR/cd
        - Striped dolphin, Stenella coeruleoalba LR/cd
        - Atlantic spotted dolphin, Stenella frontalis DD
        - Spinner dolphin, Stenella longirostris LR/cd
      - Genus: Lagenodelphis
        - Fraser's dolphin, Lagenodelphis hosei DD
      - Genus: Orcinus
        - Orca, Orcinus orca LR/cd
      - Genus: Feresa
        - Pygmy killer whale, Feresa attenuata DD
      - Genus: Pseudorca
        - False killer whale, Pseudorca crassidens LR/lc
      - Genus: Globicephala
        - Short-finned pilot whale, Globicephala macrorhynchus LR/cd
      - Genus: Peponocephala
        - Melon-headed whale, Peponocephala electra DD

== Order: Carnivora (carnivorans) ==
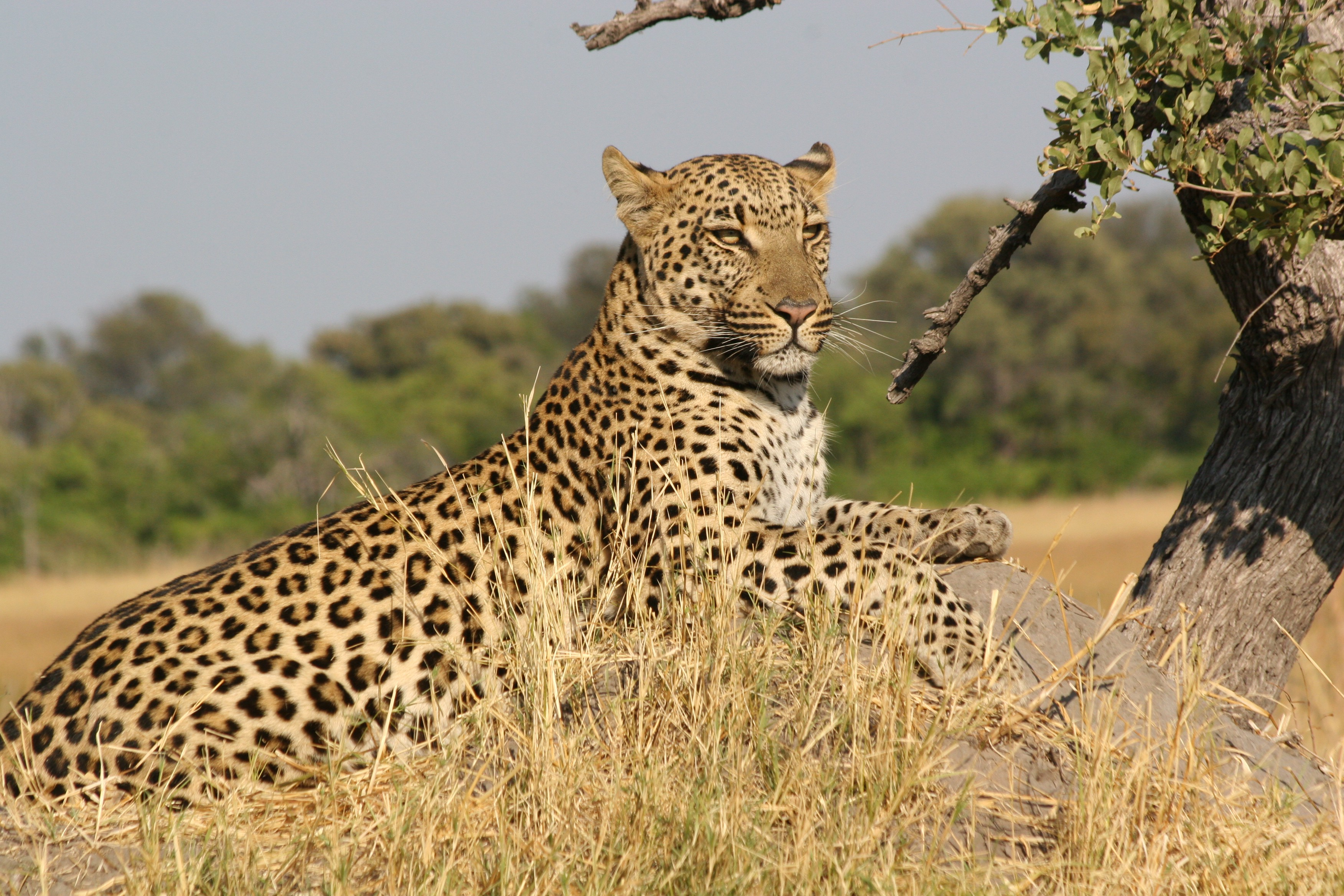
African leopard

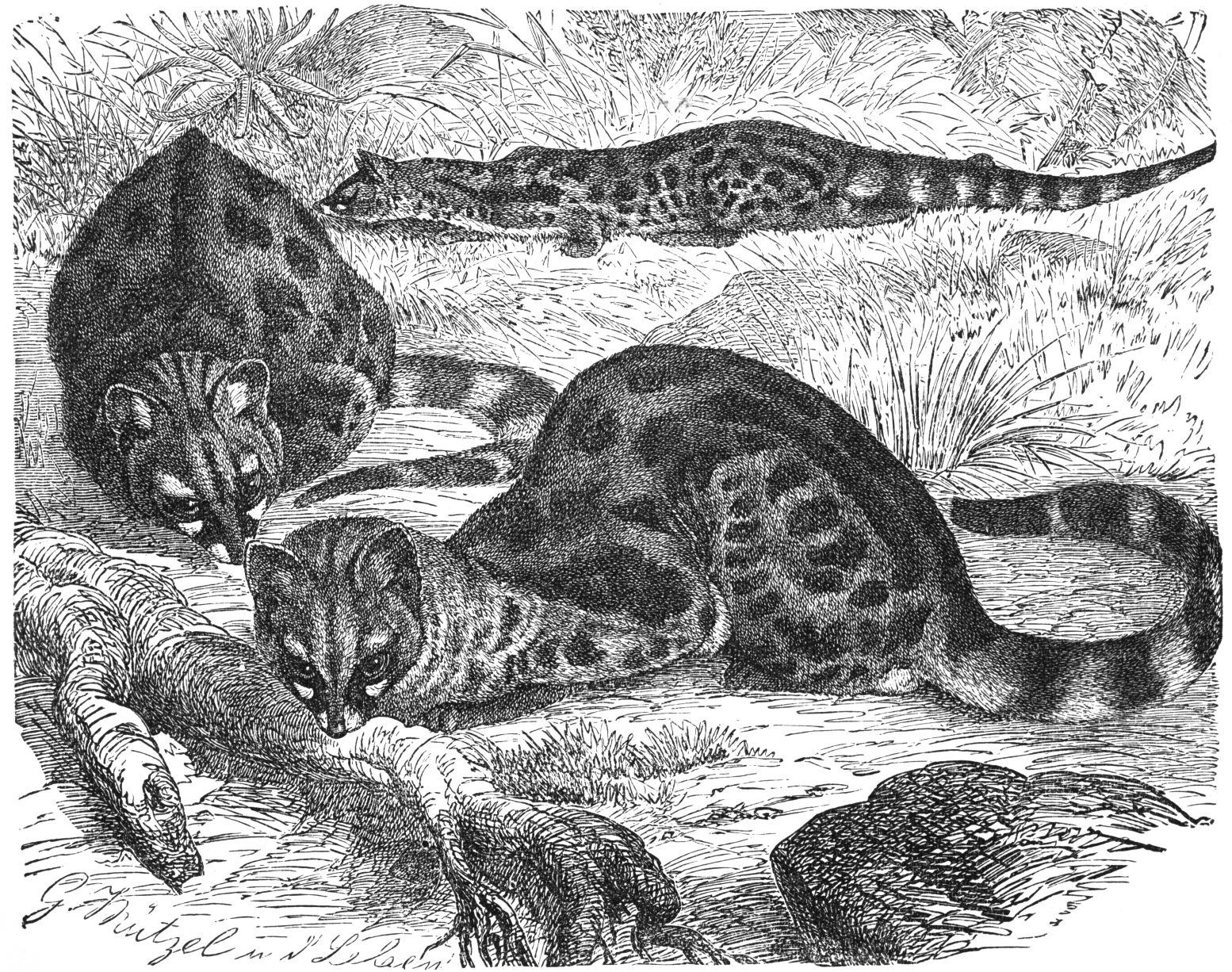
Common genet

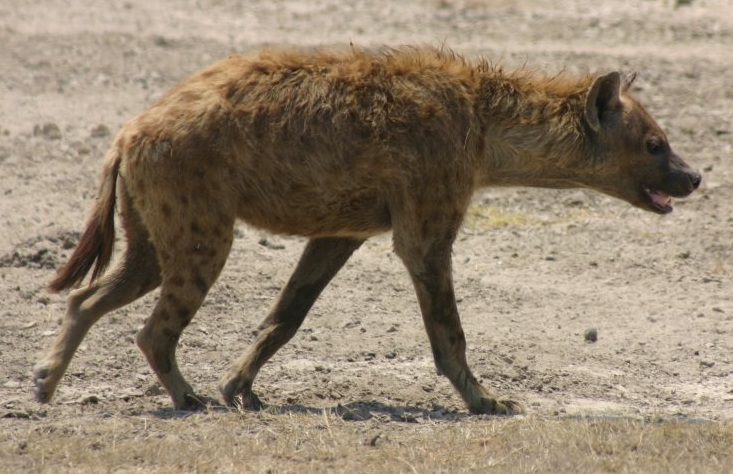
Spotted hyena

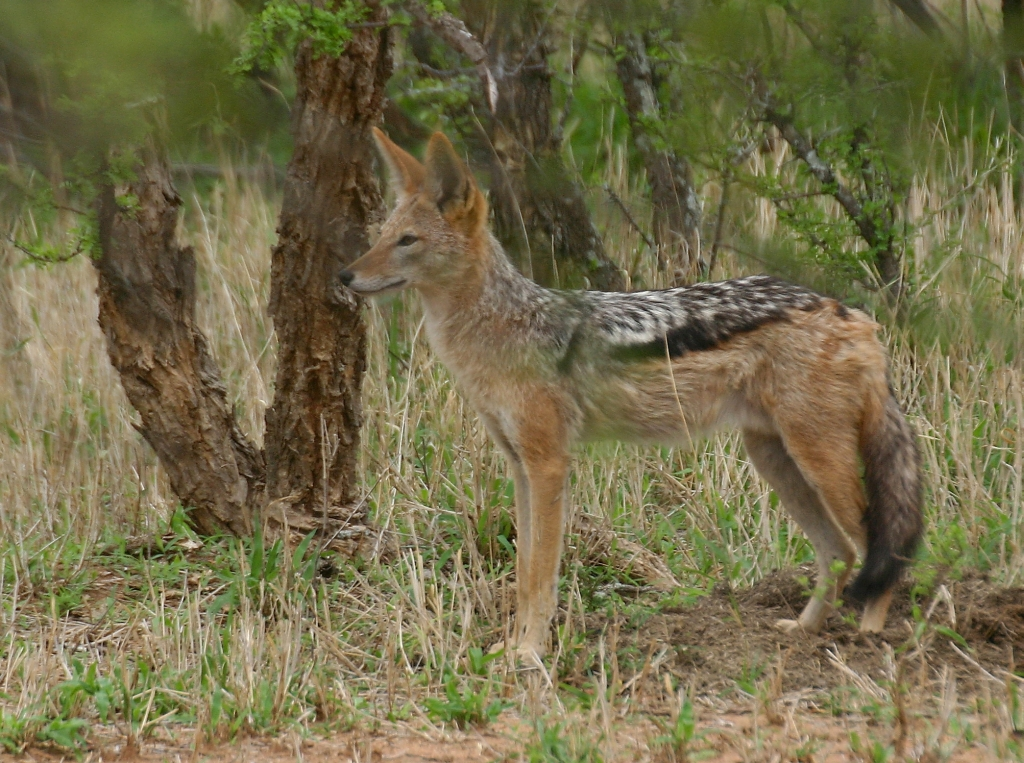
Black-backed jackal

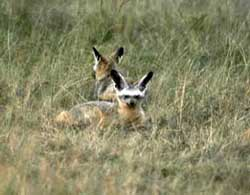
Bat-eared fox

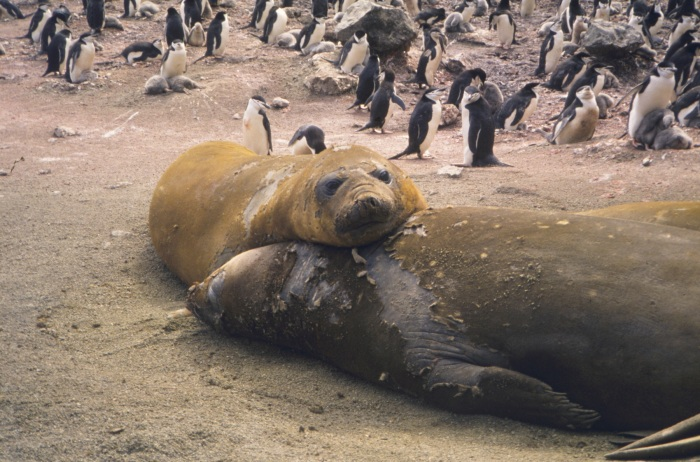
Southern elephant seal

There are over 260 species of carnivorans, the majority of which feed primarily on meat. They have a characteristic skull shape and dentition.

- Suborder: Feliformia
  - Family: Felidae (cats)
    - Subfamily: Felinae
      - Genus: Acinonyx
        - Cheetah, Acinonyx jubatus VU
      - Genus: Caracal
        - Caracal, C. caracal LC
        - African golden cat, C. aurata VU
      - Genus: Felis
        - Black-footed cat, Felis nigripes VU
        - African wildcat, F. lybica LC
      - Genus: Leptailurus
        - Serval, Leptailurus serval LC
    - Subfamily: Pantherinae
      - Genus: Panthera
        - Lion, Panthera leo VU
        - Leopard, Panthera pardus VU
  - Family: Viverridae
    - Subfamily: Viverrinae
      - Genus: Civettictis
        - African civet, Civettictis civetta LC
      - Genus: Genetta
        - Angolan genet, Genetta angolensis LC
        - Common genet, Genetta genetta LC
        - Rusty-spotted genet, Genetta maculata LC
  - Family: Nandiniidae
    - Genus: Nandinia
      - African palm civet, Nandinia binotata LC
  - Family: Herpestidae (mongooses)
    - Genus: Atilax
      - Marsh mongoose, Atilax paludinosus LC
    - Genus: Crossarchus
      - Angolan kusimanse, Crossarchus ansorgei LC
    - Genus: Cynictis
      - Yellow mongoose, Cynictis penicillata LC
    - Genus: Helogale
      - Common dwarf mongoose, Helogale parvula LC
    - Genus: Herpestes
      - Angolan slender mongoose, Herpestes flavescens LC
      - Egyptian mongoose, Herpestes ichneumon LC
      - Common slender mongoose, Herpestes sanguinea LC
    - Genus: Ichneumia
      - White-tailed mongoose, I. albicauda LC
    - Genus: Mungos
      - Banded mongoose, Mungos mungo LC
    - Genus: Paracynictis
      - Selous' mongoose, Paracynictis selousi LC
    - Genus: Suricata
      - Meerkat, Suricata suricatta LC
  - Family: Hyaenidae (hyaenas)
    - Genus: Crocuta
      - Spotted hyena, Crocuta crocuta LC
    - Genus: Parahyaena
      - Brown hyena, P. brunnea NT
    - Genus: Proteles
      - Aardwolf, Proteles cristatus LC
- Suborder: Caniformia
  - Family: Canidae (dogs, foxes)
    - Genus: Lupulella
      - Side-striped jackal, L. adusta LC
      - Black-backed jackal, L. mesomelas LC
    - Genus: Vulpes
      - Cape fox, Vulpes chama LC
    - Genus: Otocyon
      - Bat-eared fox, Otocyon megalotis LC
    - Genus: Lycaon
      - African wild dog, Lycaon pictus EN
  - Family: Mustelidae (mustelids)
    - Genus: Ictonyx
      - Striped polecat, Ictonyx striatus LC
    - Genus: Poecilogale
      - African striped weasel, Poecilogale albinucha LC
    - Genus: Mellivora
      - Honey badger, Mellivora capensis LC
    - Genus: Hydrictis
      - Speckle-throated otter, Hydrictis maculicollis LC
    - Genus: Aonyx
      - African clawless otter, Aonyx capensis LC
      - Cameroon clawless otter, Aonyx congicus NT
  - Family: Otariidae (eared seals, sealions)
    - Genus: Arctocephalus
      - Cape fur seal, Arctocephalus pusillus LC
  - Family: Phocidae (earless seals)
    - Genus: Mirounga
      - Southern elephant seal, Mirounga leonina LC

== Order: Perissodactyla (odd-toed ungulates) ==
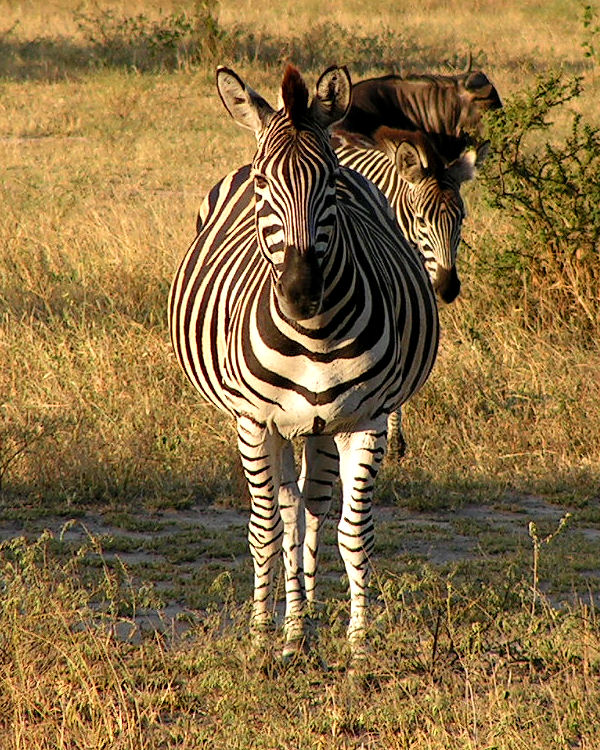
Chapman's zebra

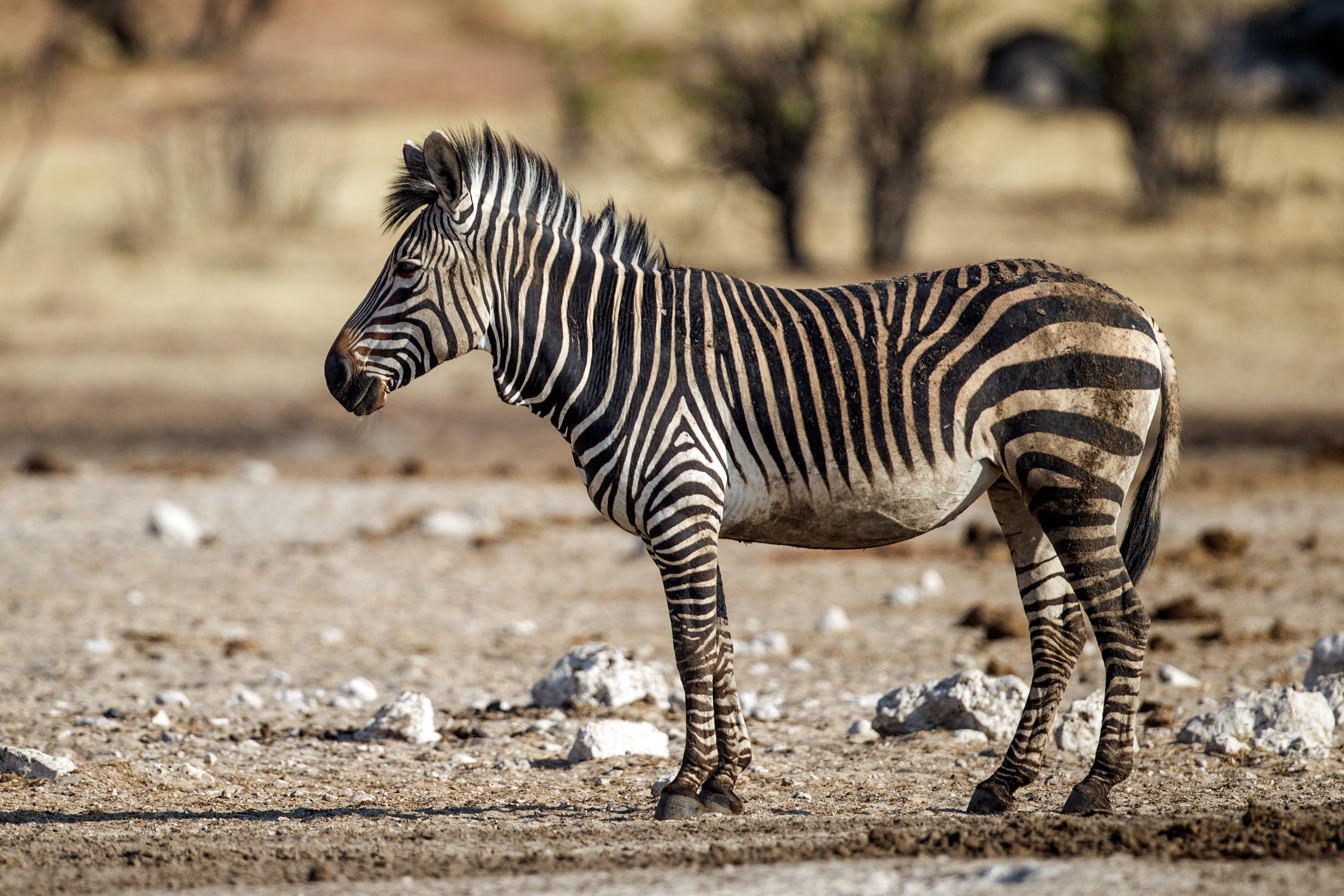
Hartmann's mountain zebra

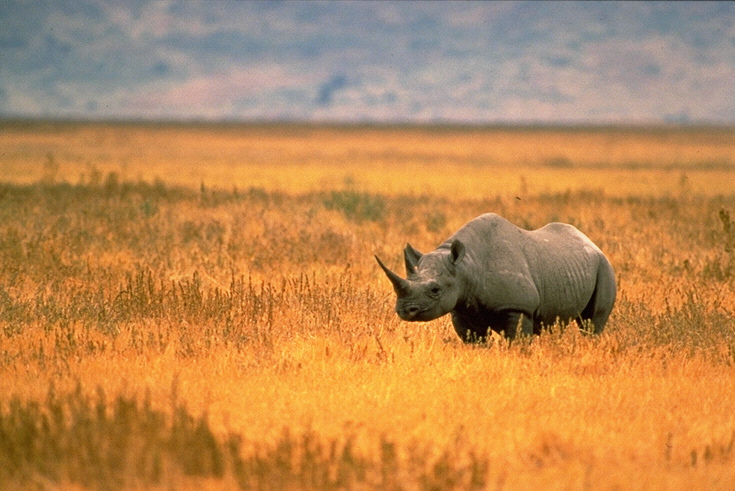
Black rhinoceros

The odd-toed ungulates are browsing and grazing mammals. They are usually large to very large, and have relatively simple stomachs and a large middle toe.

- Family: Equidae (horses etc.)
  - Genus: Equus
    - Plains zebra, E. quagga NT
      - Chapman's zebra, E. q. chapmani
      - Burchell's zebra, E. q. burchellii
      - Grant's zebra, E. q. boehmi
    - Mountain zebra, E. zebra VU
      - Hartmann's mountain zebra, E. z. hartmannae
- Family: Rhinocerotidae
  - Genus: Diceros
    - Black rhinoceros, D. bicornis CR
      - South-central black rhinoceros, D. b. minor CR
      - South-western black rhinoceros, D. b. occidentalis NT

== Order: Artiodactyla (even-toed ungulates) ==
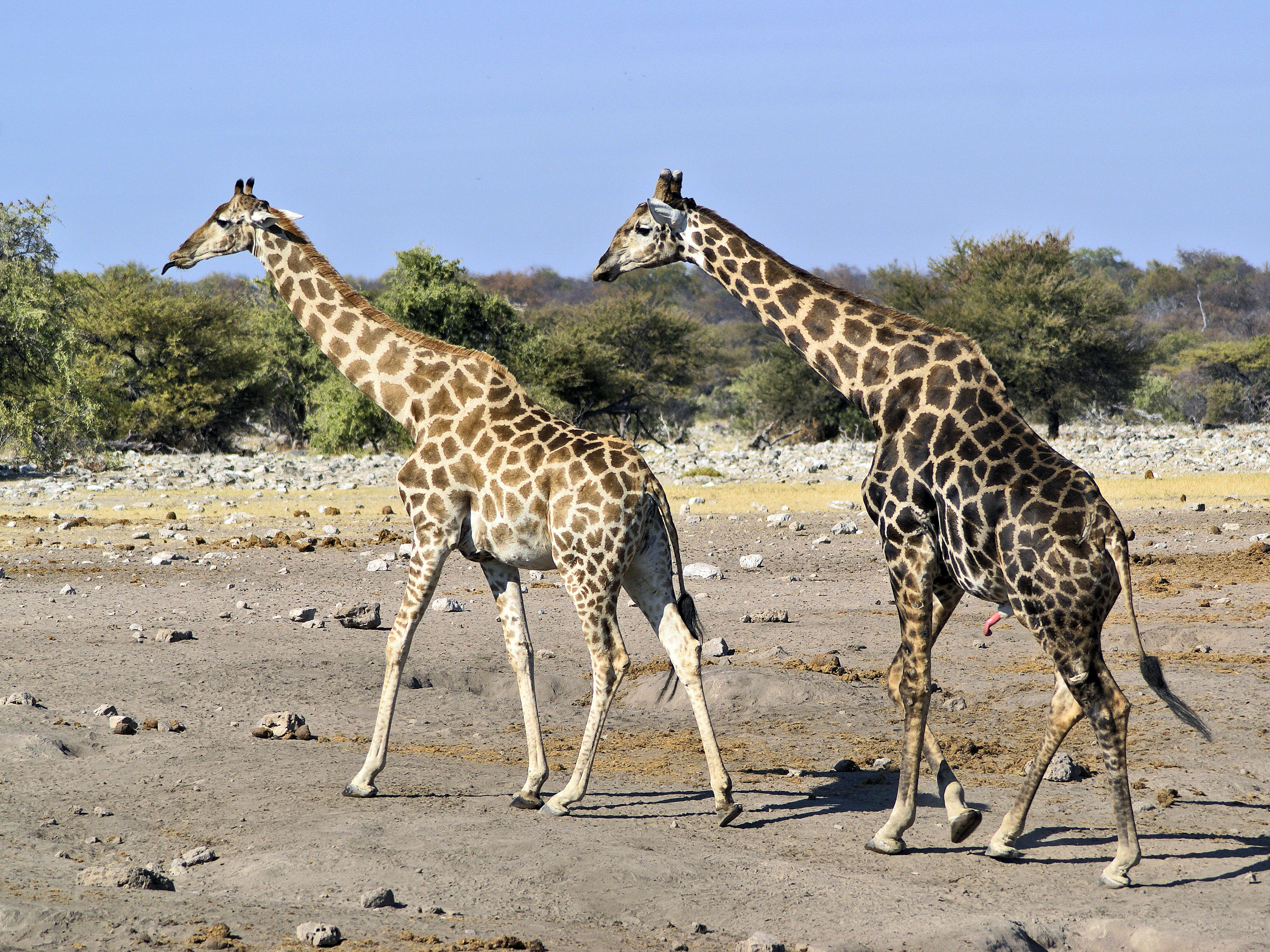
Angolan giraffe

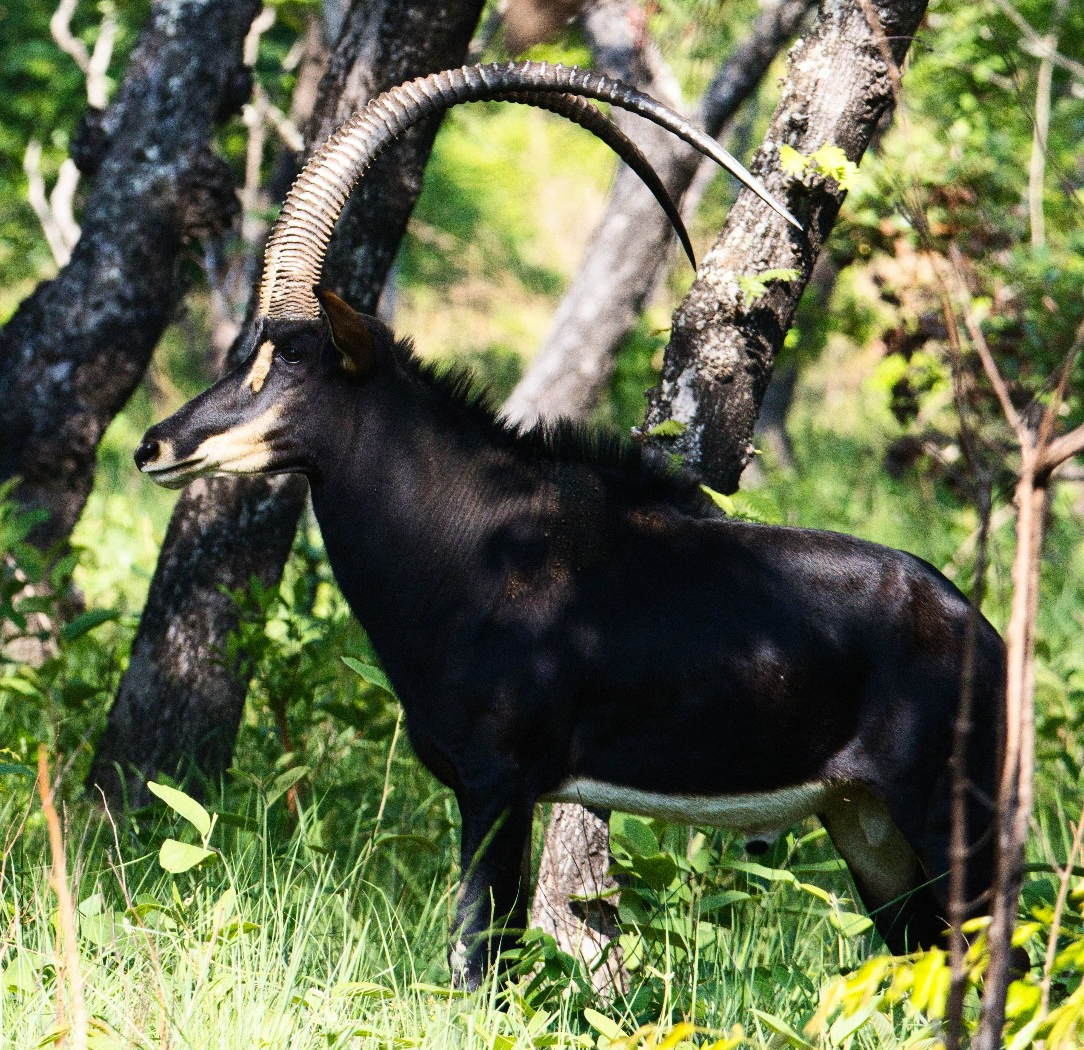
Giant sable antelope, the national animal of Angola

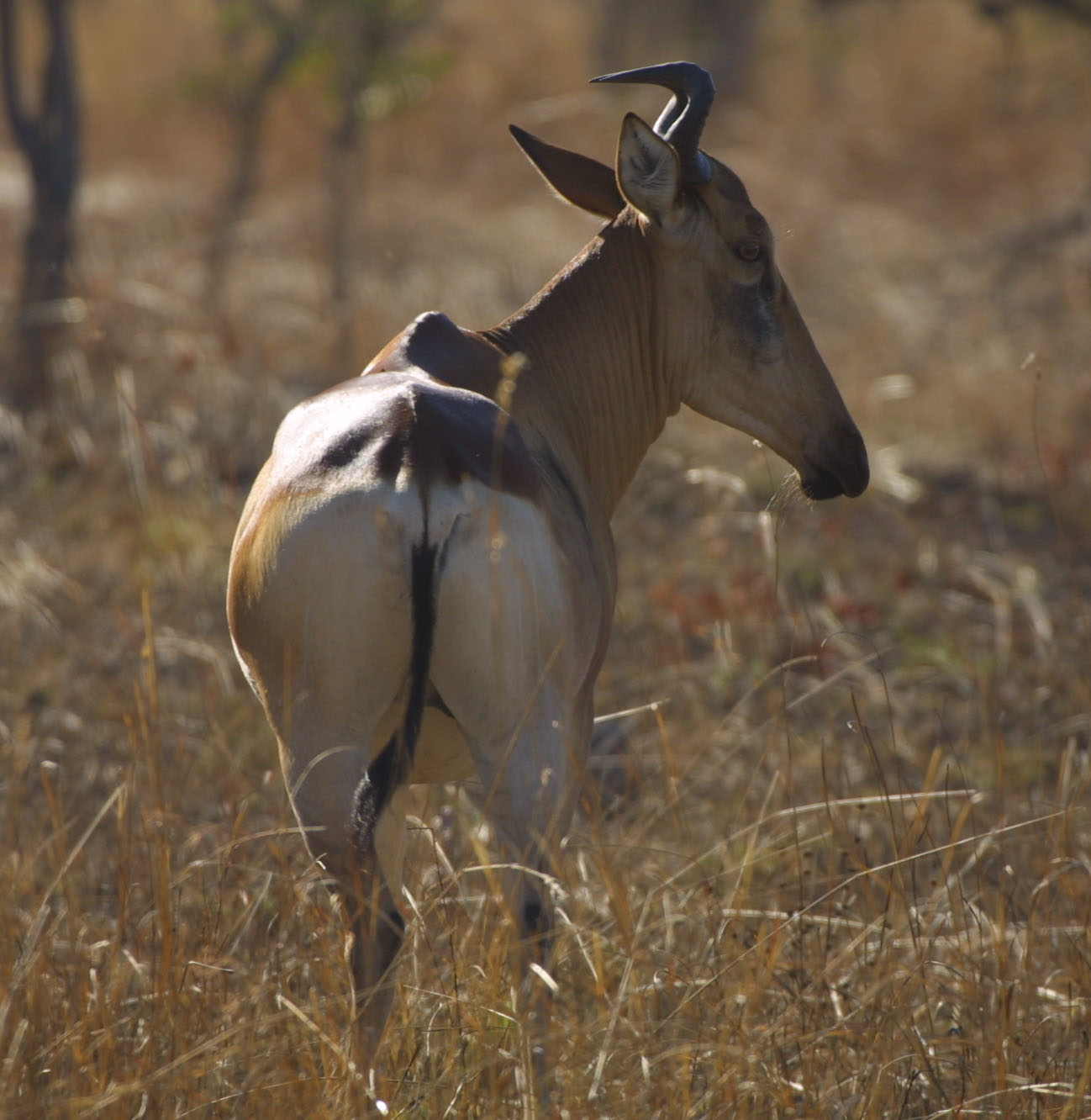
Lichtenstein's hartebeest

]

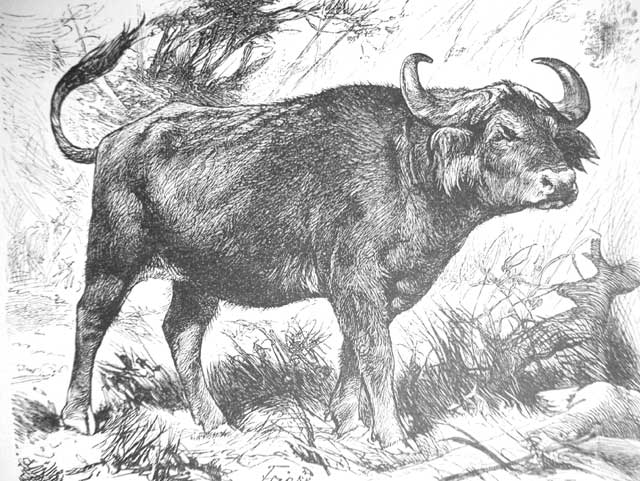
African buffalo

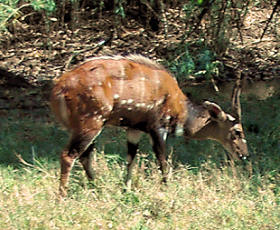
Bushbuck

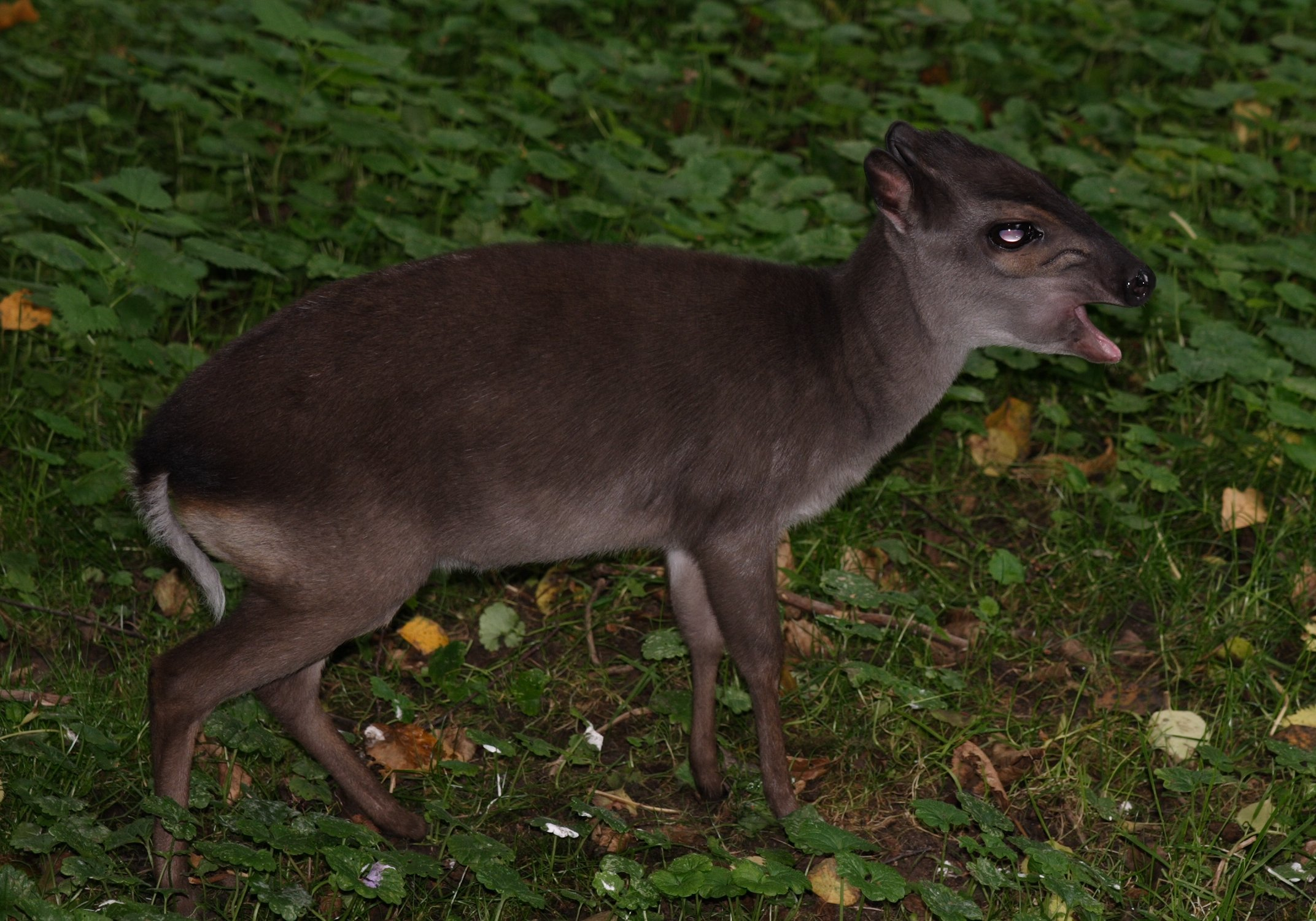
Blue duiker

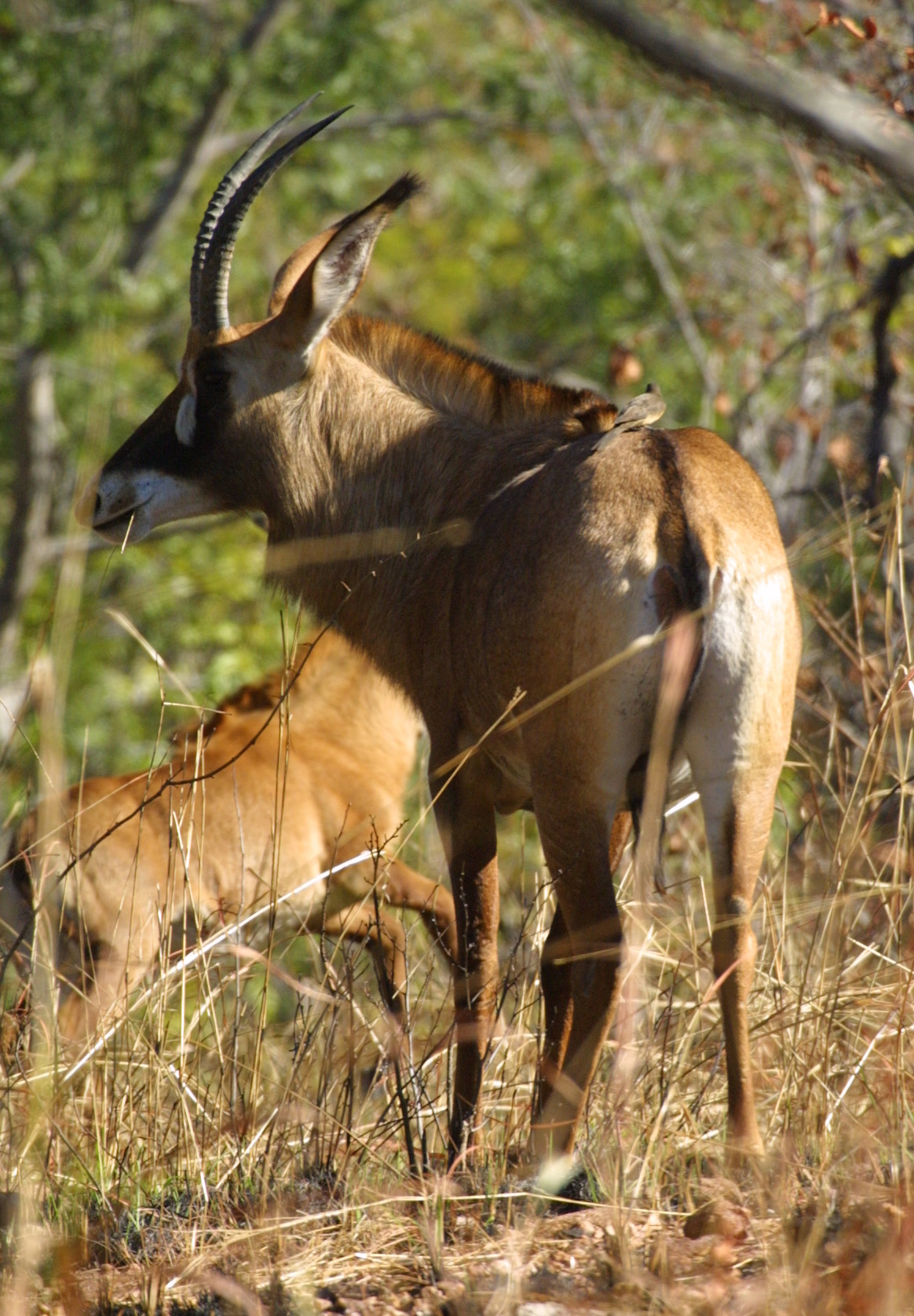
Roan antelope

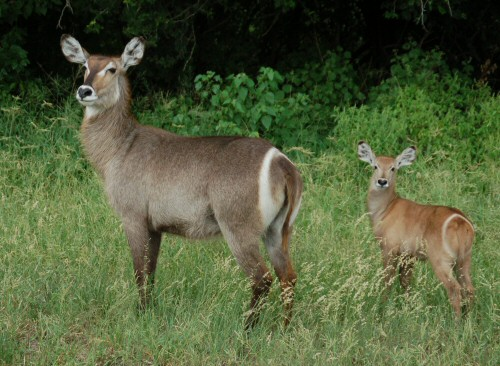
Waterbuck

The even-toed ungulates are ungulates whose weight is borne about equally by the third and fourth toes, rather than mostly or entirely by the third as in perissodactyls. There are about 220 artiodactyl species, including many that are of great economic importance to humans.

- Family: Suidae (pigs)
  - Subfamily: Phacochoerinae
    - Genus: Phacochoerus
      - Common warthog, Phacochoerus africanus
  - Subfamily: Suinae
    - Genus: Potamochoerus
      - Bushpig, Potamochoerus larvatus
- Family: Hippopotamidae (hippopotamuses)
  - Genus: Hippopotamus
    - Hippopotamus, Hippopotamus amphibius VU
- Family: Tragulidae
  - Genus: Hyemoschus
    - Water chevrotain, Hyemoschus aquaticus DD
- Family: Giraffidae (giraffe, okapi)
  - Genus: Giraffa
    - Angolan giraffe, Giraffa giraffa angolensis VU
- Family: Bovidae (cattle, antelope, sheep, goats)
  - Subfamily: Alcelaphinae
    - Genus: Alcelaphus
      - Hartebeest, A. buselaphus LC
      - Lichtenstein's hartebeest, A. lichtensteinii
    - Genus: Connochaetes
      - Blue wildebeest, Connochaetes taurinus
    - Genus: Damaliscus
      - Topi, Damaliscus lunatus
  - Subfamily: Antilopinae
    - Genus: Antidorcas
      - Springbok antelope, Antidorcas marsupialis
    - Genus: Madoqua
      - Kirk's dik-dik, Madoqua kirkii
    - Genus: Oreotragus
      - Klipspringer, Oreotragus oreotragus
    - Genus: Ourebia
      - Oribi, Ourebia ourebi
    - Genus: Raphicerus
      - Steenbok, Raphicerus campestris
  - Subfamily: Bovinae
    - Genus: Syncerus
      - African buffalo, S. caffer NT
    - Genus: Tragelaphus
      - Bongo, Tragelaphus eurycerus
      - Common eland, Tragelaphus oryx
      - Bushbuck, Tragelaphus scriptus
      - Sitatunga, Tragelaphus spekii
      - Greater kudu, Tragelaphus strepsiceros
  - Subfamily: Cephalophinae
    - Genus: Cephalophus
      - Bay duiker, Cephalophus dorsalis
      - Blue duiker, Cephalophus monticola
      - Black-fronted duiker, Cephalophus nigrifrons
      - Yellow-backed duiker, Cephalophus silvicultor
    - Genus: Sylvicapra
      - Common duiker, Sylvicapra grimmia
  - Subfamily: Hippotraginae
    - Genus: Hippotragus
      - Roan antelope, Hippotragus equinus
      - Sable antelope, Hippotragus niger
    - Genus: Oryx
      - Gemsbok, Oryx gazella LC possibly extirpated
  - Subfamily: Aepycerotinae
    - Genus: Aepyceros
      - Impala, Aepyceros melampus
  - Subfamily: Reduncinae
    - Genus: Kobus
      - Waterbuck, Kobus ellipsiprymnus
      - Lechwe, Kobus leche
      - Puku, Kobus vardonii
    - Genus: Redunca
      - Southern reedbuck, Redunca arundinum

== See also ==
- List of chordate orders
- Lists of mammals by region
- Mammal classification
- List of mammals described in the 2000s
