= Afropolonia =

Scientific classification
- Domain: Eukaryota
- Kingdom: Animalia
- Phylum: Arthropoda
- Subphylum: Chelicerata
- Class: Arachnida
- Order: Trombidiformes
- Family: Trombiculidae
- Tribe: Apoloniini
- Genus: Afropolonia; Goff, 1983

Type species
- Afropolonia tgifi Goff, 1983

Genus of mites

Afropolonia is a genus of chigger in the family Trombiculidae, subfamily Apoloniinae, and tribe Apoloniini. As of 2018, it is monospecific, just consisting of its type species A. tgifi. It is found in South Africa. Its type host is the Namaqua rock rat. M. Lee Goff circumscribed Afropolonia and described A. tgifi in 1983.

== Diagnosis and description ==
In keys to Apoloniinae species written by Goff in 1983, by Goff and colleagues in 1989, and by Wayne A. Brown in 2006, Afropolonia tgifi was paired with Apolonia tigipioensis, the sole species of its genus. All three of these keys noted Afropolonia could be distinguished from Apolonia in having five branched setae on the palpal tarsus and in lacking subterminala I.

Russian acarologist Alexandr A. Stekolnikov's 2018 key to African Trombiculidae paired Afropolonia with a pair including Straelensia and Vargatula. His key distinguished Afropolonia from those two genera in having both an anterior and a posterior pair of sternal setae, in having branched galealae, and having a coxal setation formula of 1-1-1.

The idiosoma, or body, of the A. tgifi larva measures 455 μm × 230 μm (0.0179 in × 0.0091 in). Its anterior eyes are 11 μm in diameter while its posterior eyes have a diameter of 6 μm.

== Phylogeny ==
Afropolonia is in the subfamily Apoloniinae. Goff placed Afropolonia in the tribe Apoloniini due to the sensillae having an "unexpanded" shape. Goff also included the genera Apolonia, Straelensia, Vargatula, and Womersia in Apoloniini, following P. H. Vercammen-Grandjean and M. Kolebinova's 1968 circumscription of the tribe. A fifth genus, Liuella was later added to this tribe.

== Distribution ==
Afropolonia is found in South Africa. The type locality for A. tgifi is Studers Pass. (Note: Goff's 1983 paper reported the type locality as "Sturder Pass".)

== Biology ==
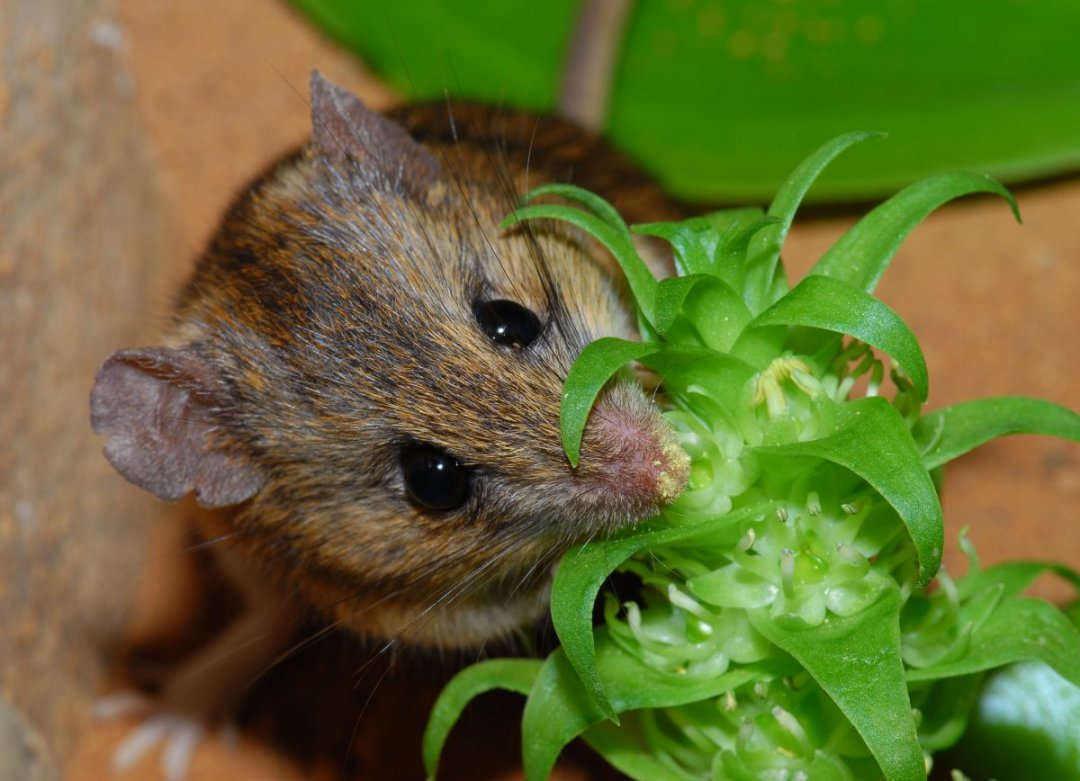
Namaqua rock rat (Aethomys namaquensis)

The type host is the Namaqua rock rat. (Note: Goff's 1983 paper reported the type host under the combination Aethomys namaquensis.) As of 2018, this is the only known host.

== Taxonomic history ==
The American entomologist M. Lee Goff circumscribed the genus Afropolonia in 1983. Goff designated A. tgifi, which he described in the same work, as the genus's type species. This was the sole species included in the genus. Goff's description was based on two specimens collected in 1980. The holotype was deposited in the Royal Belgian Institute of Natural Sciences; the paratype was deposited in the National Museum of Natural History.

The specific epithet of the type species comes from the acronym TGIF ("Thank God It's Friday"). Goff had initially planned to describe this species in the Journal of Medical Entomology, although they rejected his paper because of this name; at the time, the ICZN Code discouraged "comical" names. Goff has surmised that the Bulletin of the Royal Belgian Institute of Natural Sciences subsequently accepted his paper because the European editors were unfamiliar with this term.
