= Hinde's rock rat =

Conservation status
- Least Concern (IUCN 3.1)

Scientific classification
- Kingdom: Animalia
- Phylum: Chordata
- Class: Mammalia
- Order: Rodentia
- Family: Muridae
- Genus: Aethomys
- Species: A. hindei

Binomial name
- Aethomys hindei (Thomas, 1902)

Species of rodent

Hinde's rock rat (Aethomys hindei) is a species of rodent in the family Muridae found in Burundi, Cameroon, the Central African Republic, the Democratic Republic of the Congo, Ethiopia, Kenya, Rwanda, Sudan, Tanzania, and Uganda. Its natural habitats are subtropical or tropical moist lowland forest, moist savanna, and subtropical or tropical seasonally wet or flooded lowland grassland. Oldfield Thomas named it in honor of Sidney Langford Hinde, a British officer and recreational naturalist.
