= Grant's rock mouse =

Conservation status
- Least Concern (IUCN 3.1)

Scientific classification
- Kingdom: Animalia
- Phylum: Chordata
- Class: Mammalia
- Order: Rodentia
- Family: Muridae
- Genus: Micaelamys
- Species: M. granti

Binomial name
- Micaelamys granti (Wroughton, 1908)

Synonyms
- Aethomys granti Rattus granti

Species of rodent

Grant's rock mouse or Grant's rock rat (Micaelamys granti) is a species of rodent in the family Muridae found only in South Africa. It is sometimes included in the genus Aethomys. Its natural habitats are subtropical or tropical dry shrubland and rocky areas. Its tail is a dark color, fur is dark grey, while the lower part of the body is a yellowish color. Mass is about 40g, total length is 20cm, and its tail is an equal length to the body (10cm).
