= Selinda veld rat =

Conservation status
- Data Deficient (IUCN 3.1)

Scientific classification
- Kingdom: Animalia
- Phylum: Chordata
- Class: Mammalia
- Order: Rodentia
- Family: Muridae
- Genus: Aethomys
- Species: A. silindensis

Binomial name
- Aethomys silindensis Roberts, 1938

Species of rodent

The Selinda veld rat or Silinda rock rat (Aethomys silindensis) is a species of rodent in the family Muridae found in possibly Mozambique and Zimbabwe. Its natural habitat is subtropical or tropical dry forests.
