= Tinfields rock rat =

Conservation status
- Data Deficient (IUCN 3.1)

Scientific classification
- Kingdom: Animalia
- Phylum: Chordata
- Class: Mammalia
- Order: Rodentia
- Family: Muridae
- Genus: Aethomys
- Species: A. stannarius

Binomial name
- Aethomys stannarius (Thomas, 1913)

Species of rodent

The Tinfields rock rat, West African Aethomys, West African rock rat or West African veld rat (Aethomys stannarius) is a species of rodent in the family Muridae found in Cameroon and Nigeria. Its natural habitats are dry savanna, subtropical or tropical dry shrubland, and subtropical or tropical dry lowland grassland.

== Characteristics ==
The West African rock rat is a medium-sized rodent with soft fur. Its dorsal (upper) side is medium brown, gradually transitioning to white on the ventral (underside). The ears are medium-sized and brown. The tail is relatively long, measuring 103–110% of the head and body length, and is covered in scales—brown on top and paler underneath. The limbs are relatively short. The forefeet and hindfeet are bright yellowish-brown on the upper side, with four digits on the forefeet and five on the hindfeet.

The head-and-body length ranges from 126 to 169 mm, with a tail length of 124 to 203 mm. Ear length is between 20 and 24 mm, and the hindfoot measures 28 to 33 mm. Individuals typically weigh between 60 and 120 grams.
