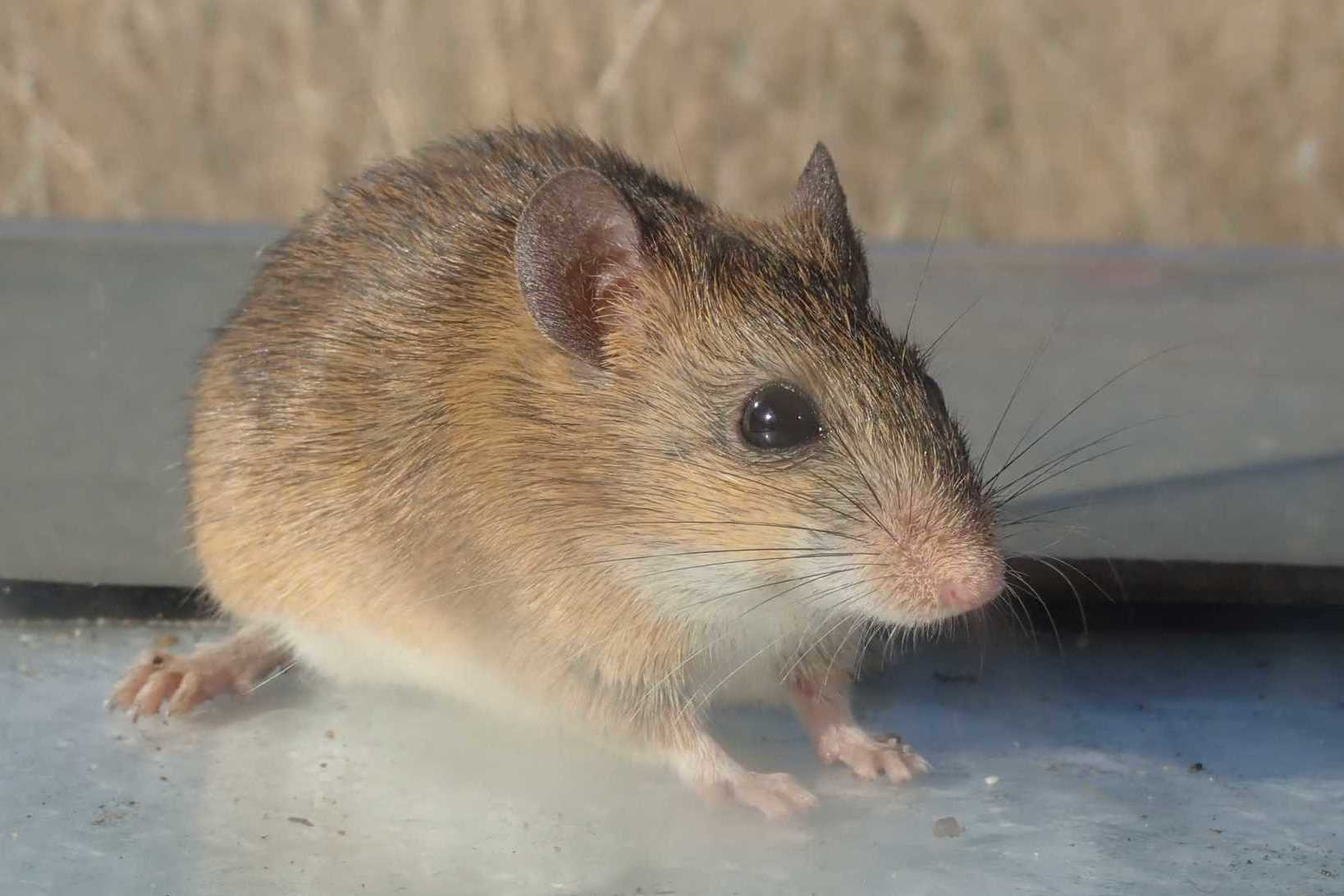

Conservation status
- Least Concern (IUCN 3.1)

Scientific classification
- Kingdom: Animalia
- Phylum: Chordata
- Class: Mammalia
- Order: Rodentia
- Family: Muridae
- Genus: Aethomys
- Species: A. ineptus

Binomial name
- Aethomys ineptus (Thomas & Wroughton, 1908)

Synonyms
- Aethomys chrysophilus ineptus

= Tete veld aethomys =

Species of rodent

The Tete veld aethomys or Tete veld rat (Aethomys ineptus) is a species of rodent in the family Muridae. It is found in South Africa and Eswatini. Its natural habitats are temperate forests, shrubland, and grassland. The common name refers to the type locality, Tete, on the Zambesi River.

== Description ==
The Tete veld rat is moderately sized, with a head-body length of 12 to 18 cm (4.7 to 7.1 in), an almost hairless tail measuring 14 to 17 cm (5.5 to 6.7 in), and a weight of 65 to 107 g (2.3 to 3.8 oz). The fur is reddish-brown over most of the body, but ticked with blackish hairs, giving an overall shade varying from brown to cinnamon. The underparts are white or very pale grey, with the fur being sharply demarcated from that on the rest of the body.

Tete veld rats are physically indistinguishable from the closely related red rock rats, and were thought to represent a subspecies of the latter until as recently as 1998. In that year, genetic analysis revealed that the two species were distinct, making the Tete veld rat an example of a cryptic species. Other than analysis of chromosomes or mitochondrial DNA, the two species can only be reliably distinguished by the shape of their spermatozoa, which have an unusual spatulated shape in Tete veld rats.

== Distribution and habitat ==
Because of the extreme physical similarity between Tete veld rats and red rock rats, the exact range of the latter is unclear, and some areas may exist where both species are found together. However, the current best estimate suggests that Tete veld rats are found in Eswatini and northeastern South Africa, where they are found in the North West, Limpopo, Mpumalanga, Gauteng, and KwaZulu-Natal provinces, and the northern part of Free State province. They may also be found in some neighbouring regions of Mozambique and Botswana, although this has yet to be confirmed. They prefer environments with substantial cover, whether from low-lying vegetation or rocky outcrops. While they are typically found at elevations of over 1,000 m (3,300 ft), they can also be found at much lower altitudes, including coastal forests near Durban.

Although up to eight subspecies have previously been recognised, some evidence indicates a gradual clinal change in physical features with latitude, meaning these subspecies may not be distinct and that the Tete veld rat is monotypic.

== Biology and behaviour ==
Tete veld rats are nocturnal and primarily herbivorous, feeding on a mix of vegetation, especially including seeds, although insects form up to 9% of their diet. Individuals inhabit nonexclusive home ranges between 1,500 and 3,000 m^{2} (16,000 and 32,000 sq ft), and the population density is relatively low, typically less than 18/ha (7.3/acre). It has been reported to be semi-arboreal in habits.

The rats breed in the summer and autumn, and may give birth to up to two litters a year. Litters consist of up to three young. Based on the relatively small size of the male's testes, they have been suggested to be monogamous, with little competition between males.
