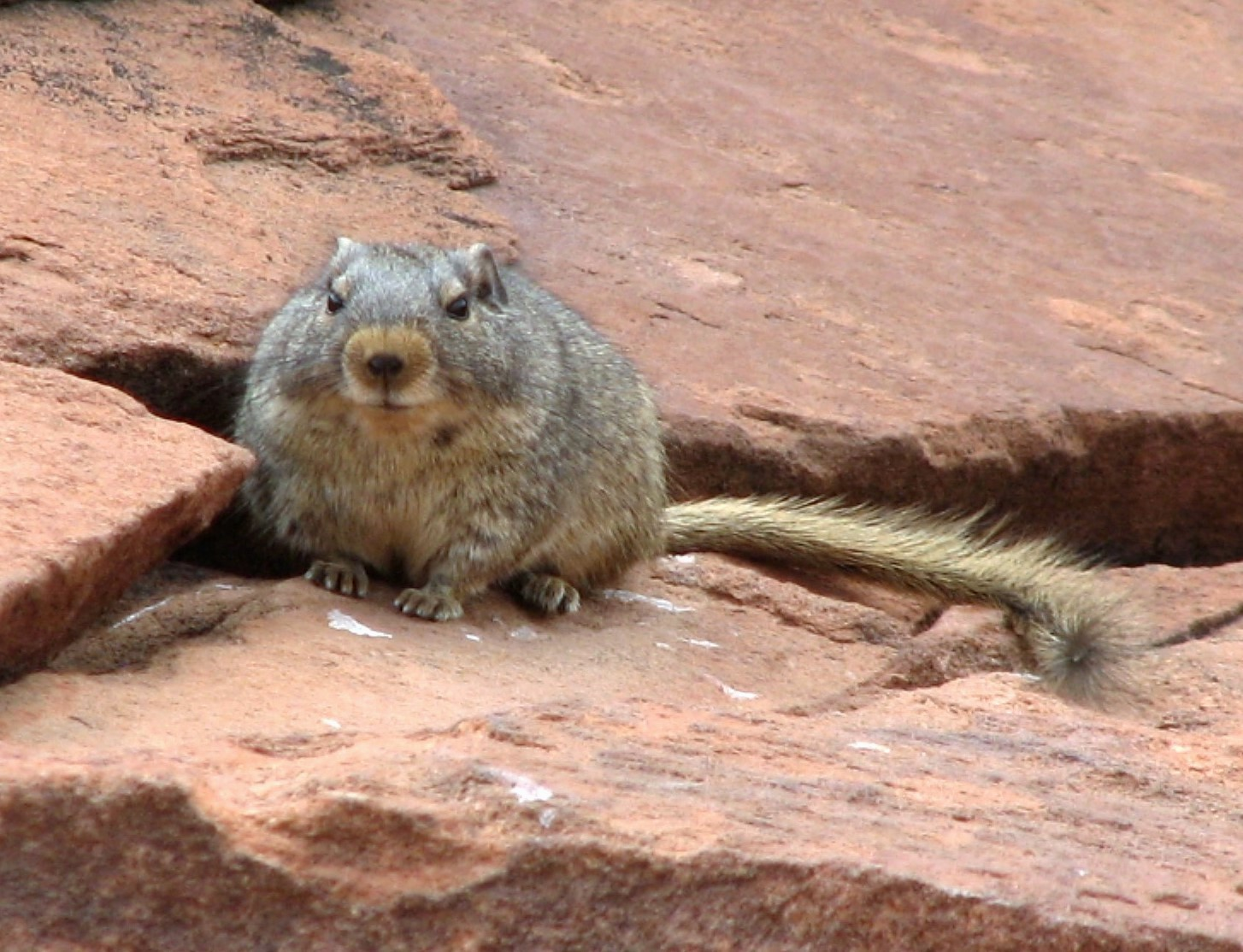

Scientific classification
- Domain: Eukaryota
- Kingdom: Animalia
- Phylum: Chordata
- Class: Mammalia
- Order: Rodentia
- Parvorder: Phiomorpha
- Family: Petromuridae; Tullberg, 1899

Genera
- Petromus; †Apodecter; †Tufamys

= Petromuridae =

Petromuridae Temporal range: Oligocene - Recent 23.7–0 Ma

Family of rodents

Petromuridae is a family of hystricognath rodents that contains the dassie rat (Petromus typicus) of southwestern Africa, the only extant member of this group.

The genus Petromus contains a couple of extinct species, and additionally there are fossil genera formerly of the family Thryonomyidae that were found to belong to this family instead; Apodecter, Tufamys and two species of Paraphiomys (australis and roessneri) which have yet to be placed in their own genus.
