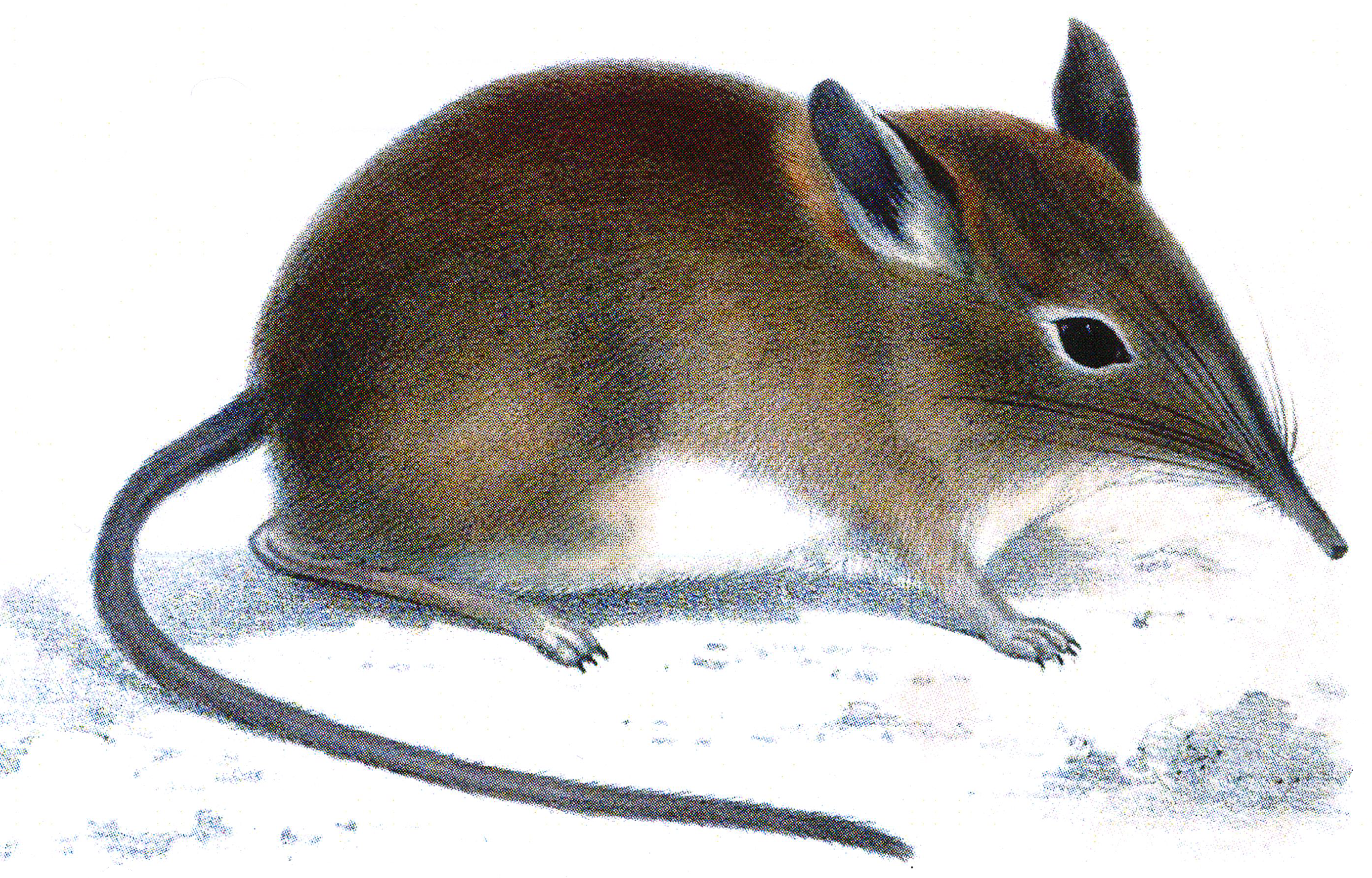

Conservation status
- Least Concern (IUCN 3.1)

Scientific classification
- Kingdom: Animalia
- Phylum: Chordata
- Class: Mammalia
- Infraclass: Placentalia
- Order: Macroscelidea
- Family: Macroscelididae
- Genus: Elephantulus
- Species: E. rupestris

Binomial name
- Elephantulus rupestris (A. Smith, 1831)
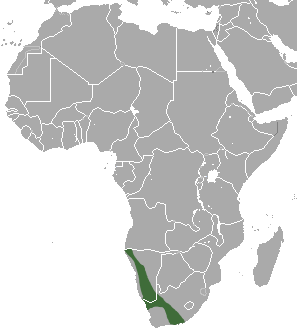
- Western rock sengi range

= Western rock sengi =

Species of mammal

The western rock sengi or western rock elephant shrew (Elephantulus rupestris) is a species of small mammal in the sengi family (Macroscelididae). It is found in Namibia, South Africa, and possibly Angola and Botswana. Its natural habitats are subtropical or tropical dry shrubland and rocky areas.

Smaller members of western rock sengi possess functional brown adipose tissue, which changes in thermogenic capacity depending on the season.
