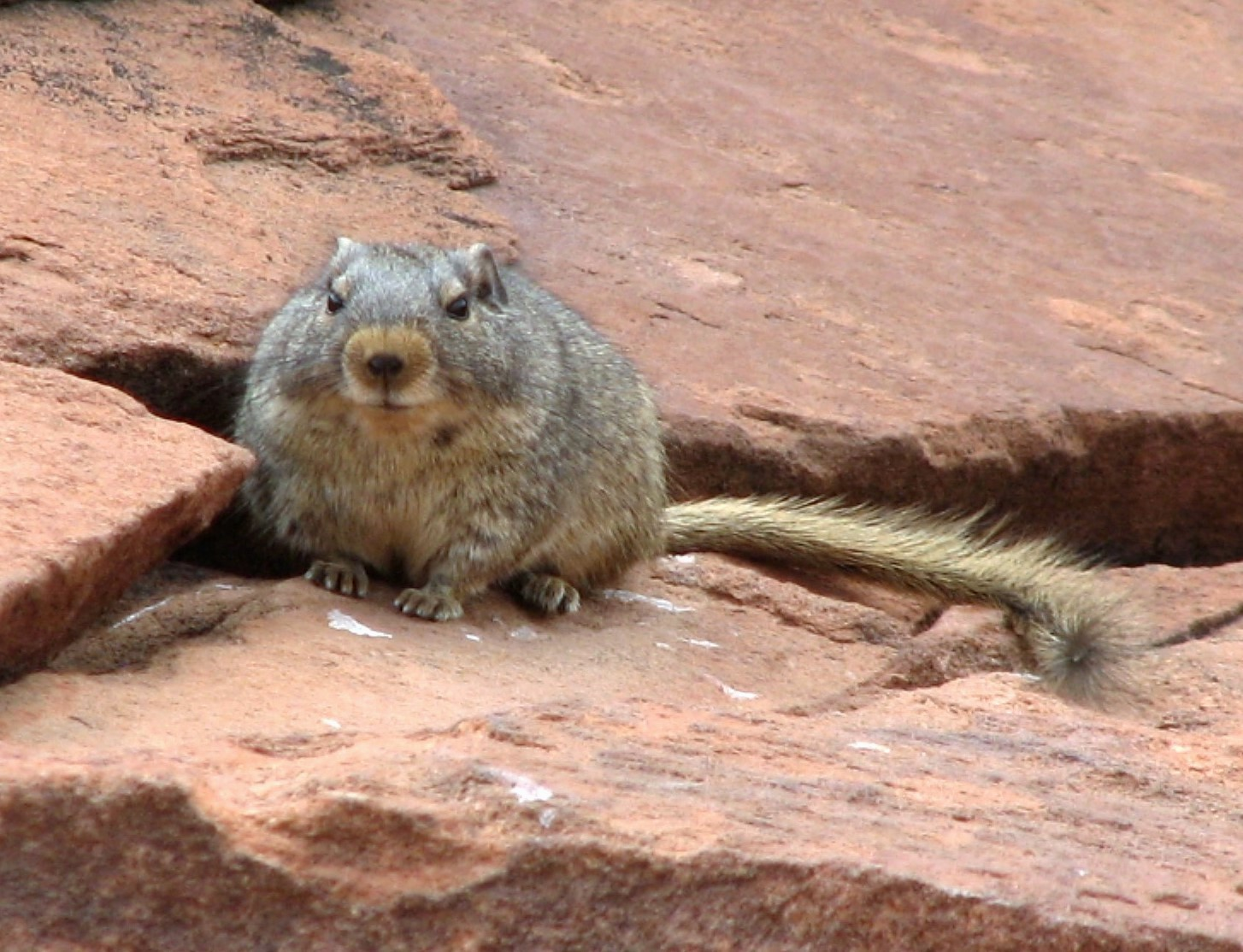
- Dassie rat (Petromus typicus)

Scientific classification
- Domain: Eukaryota
- Kingdom: Animalia
- Phylum: Chordata
- Class: Mammalia
- Order: Rodentia
- Family: Petromuridae
- Genus: Petromus; A. Smith, 1831

Type species
- Petromus typicus A. Smith, 1831

Species
- Petromus typicus; †Petromus antiquus; †Petromus minor

= Petromus =

Petromus Temporal range: Early Pliocene - Recent 5.3–0 Ma

Family of rodents

Petromus is a genus of hystricognath rodents that contains the dassie rat (Petromus typicus) of southwestern Africa, the only extant member of this group and the entire family Petromuridae.

Two fossil species are known from the Pliocene, with the oldest being Petromus antiquus of the Early Pliocene.
