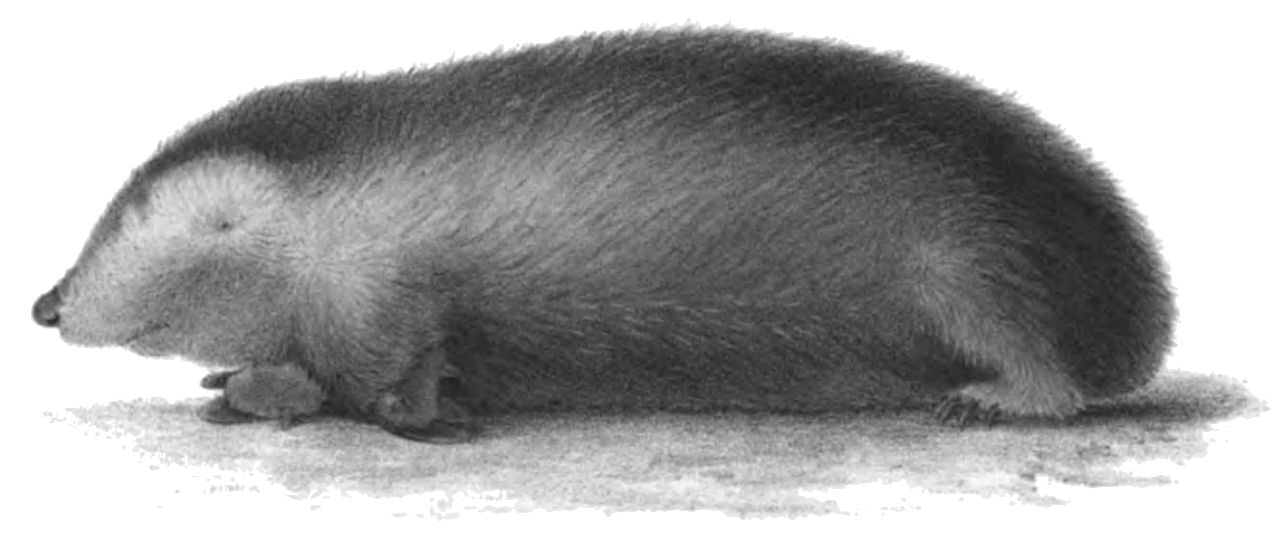
- Calcochloris obtusirostris

Scientific classification
- Domain: Eukaryota
- Kingdom: Animalia
- Phylum: Chordata
- Class: Mammalia
- Order: Afrosoricida
- Family: Chrysochloridae
- Subfamily: Amblysominae
- Genus: Calcochloris; Mivart, 1867

Type species
- Chrysochloris obtusirostris Peters, 1851

Species
- Calcochloris obtusirostris; Calcochloris tytonis
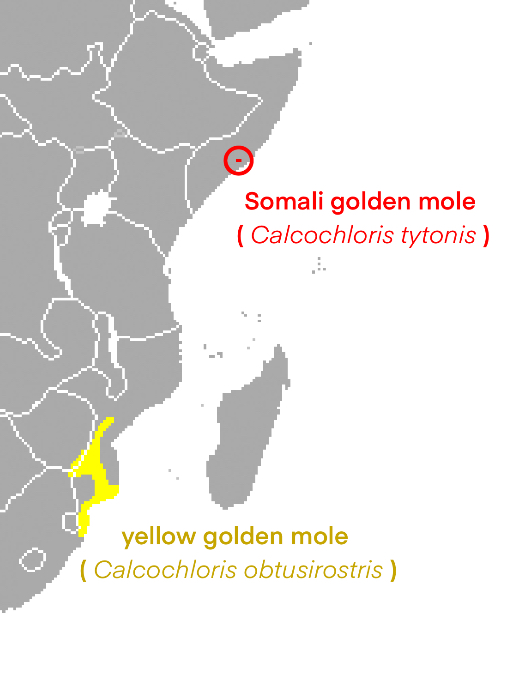

= Calcochloris =

Genus of mammals

Calcochloris is a genus of mammal in the family Chrysochloridae. It contains the following species:

- Yellow golden mole (Calcochloris obtusirostris)
- Somali golden mole (Calcochloris tytonis)
