= Nyika rock rat =

Conservation status
- Least Concern (IUCN 3.1)

Scientific classification
- Kingdom: Animalia
- Phylum: Chordata
- Class: Mammalia
- Order: Rodentia
- Family: Muridae
- Genus: Aethomys
- Species: A. nyikae

Binomial name
- Aethomys nyikae (Thomas, 1897)

Species of rodent

The Nyika rock rat (Aethomys nyikae) is a species of rodent in the family Muridae found in Angola, the Democratic Republic of the Congo, Malawi, and Zambia. Its natural habitat is subtropical or tropical dry forest.
