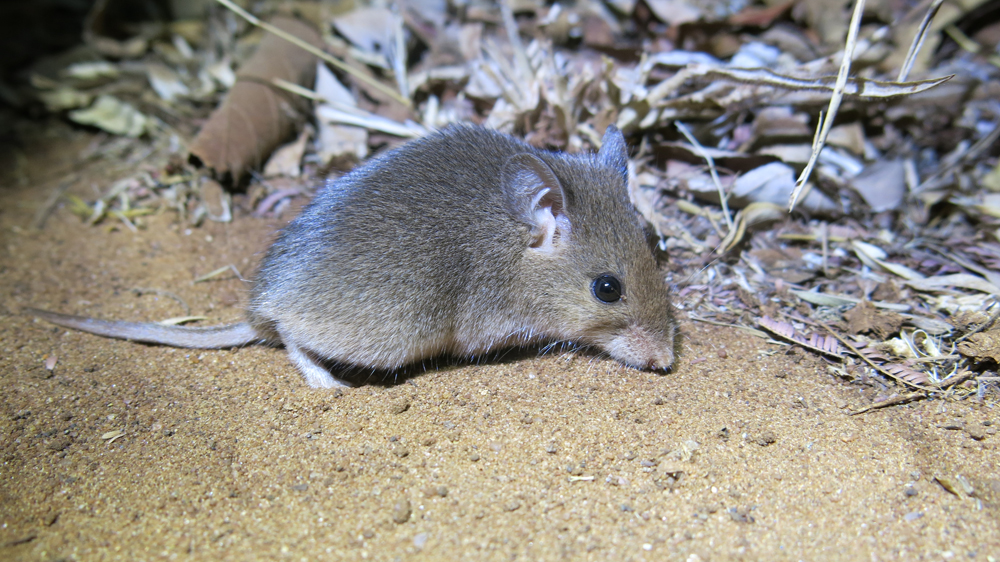
- Soutpansberg, South Africa

Conservation status
- Least Concern (IUCN 3.1)

Scientific classification
- Kingdom: Animalia
- Phylum: Chordata
- Class: Mammalia
- Order: Rodentia
- Family: Nesomyidae
- Genus: Saccostomus
- Species: S. campestris

Binomial name
- Saccostomus campestris Peters, 1846

= South African pouched mouse =

Species of rodent

The South African pouched mouse or southern African pouched mouse (Saccostomus campestris) is a species of rodent in the family Nesomyidae, which is viewed as actually representing a complex of at least three undescribed species. It is found in southern Africa in Angola, Botswana, DR Congo, Malawi, Mozambique, Namibia, South Africa, Eswatini, Tanzania, Zambia and Zimbabwe. This species occurs in savanna woodland, as well as various other habitats, at elevations from 50 to 2000 m. It is present in arid regions of Namibia. The rodent is abundant and is tolerant of human disturbance of its habitat. Its behaviour has been studied extensively, and it is known to dig burrows extending up to 8.5 metres (28 ft) in length. Individuals enter torpor during the cool, dry season, having built up fat reserves during the wet season.
