= Kaiser's rock rat =

Conservation status
- Least Concern (IUCN 3.1)

Scientific classification
- Kingdom: Animalia
- Phylum: Chordata
- Class: Mammalia
- Order: Rodentia
- Family: Muridae
- Genus: Aethomys
- Species: A. kaiseri

Binomial name
- Aethomys kaiseri (Noack, 1887)

Species of rodent

Kaiser's rock rat (Aethomys kaiseri) is a species of rodent in the family Muridae found in Angola, Burundi, the Democratic Republic of the Congo, Kenya, Malawi, Rwanda, Tanzania, Uganda, and Zambia. Its natural habitats are subtropical or tropical dry forests and subtropical or tropical moist montane forests.
