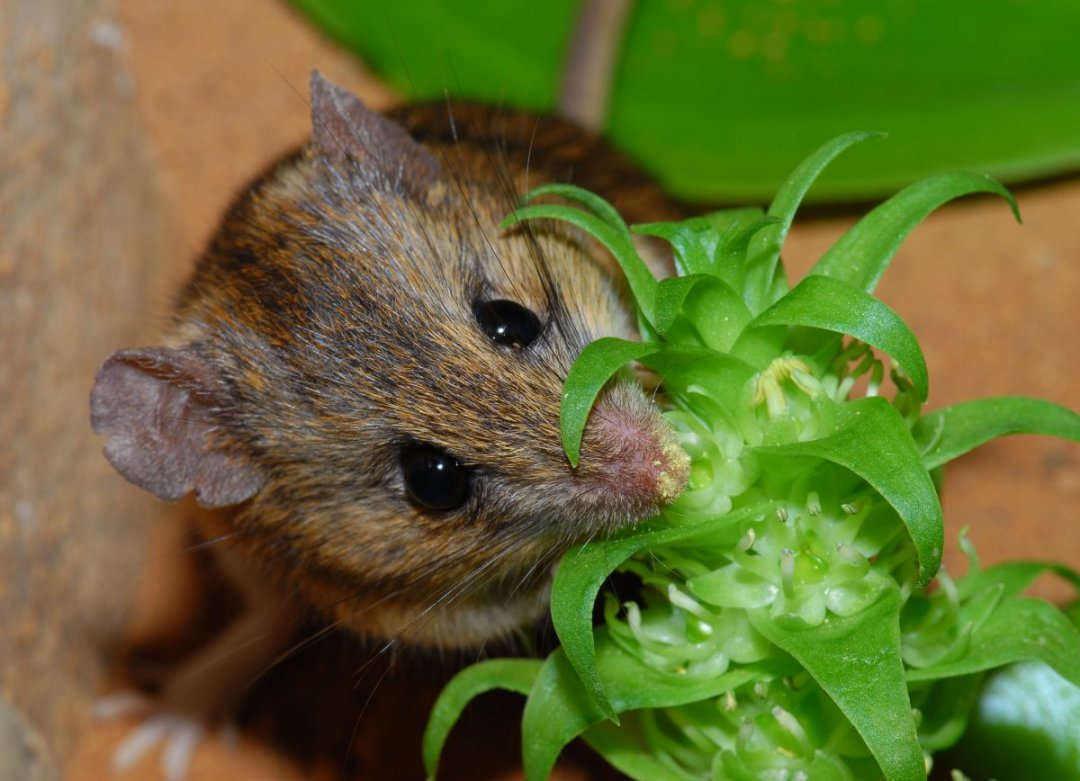
- Feeding on nectar

Conservation status
- Least Concern (IUCN 3.1)

Scientific classification
- Kingdom: Animalia
- Phylum: Chordata
- Class: Mammalia
- Order: Rodentia
- Family: Muridae
- Genus: Micaelamys
- Species: M. namaquensis

Binomial name
- Micaelamys namaquensis (A. Smith, 1834)

Synonyms
- Aethomys namaquensis

= Namaqua rock rat =

Species of rodent

The Namaqua rock rat (Micaelamys namaquensis) is a species of rodent in the family Muridae. It is sometimes included in the genus Aethomys. It is found in Angola, Botswana, Lesotho, Malawi, Mozambique, Namibia, South Africa, Eswatini, Zambia, and Zimbabwe. Its natural habitats are temperate forest, dry savanna, temperate shrubland, subtropical or tropical dry shrubland, temperate grassland, rocky areas, hot desert, temperate desert, rocky shores, arable land, rural gardens, and urban areas.

Parasites include the chigger species: Afropolonia tgifi, Gahrliepia nana, Acomatacarus thallomyia, Hyracarus lawrencei, Herpetacarus aethomys, Herpetacarus longispinus, and Zumptrombicula misonnei.
