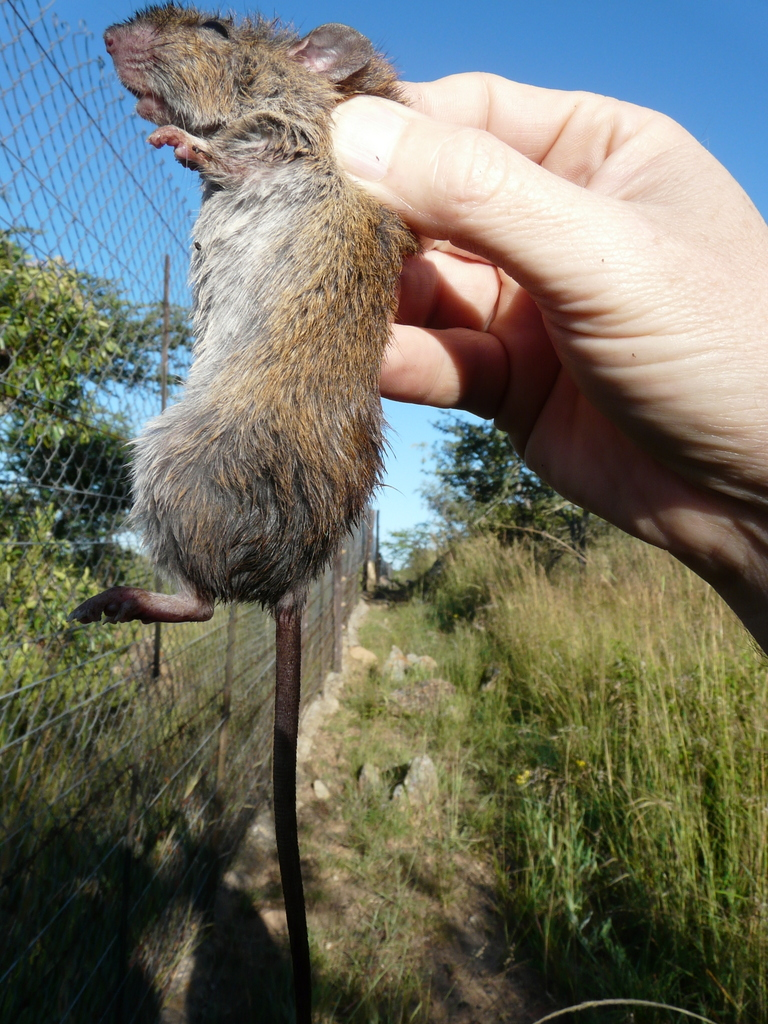

Conservation status
- Least Concern (IUCN 3.1)

Scientific classification
- Kingdom: Animalia
- Phylum: Chordata
- Class: Mammalia
- Order: Rodentia
- Family: Muridae
- Genus: Aethomys
- Species: A. chrysophilus

Binomial name
- Aethomys chrysophilus (de Winton, 1897)

Synonyms
- Mus voi Osgood, 1910; Mus chrysophilus subsp. acticola Thomas and Wroughton, 1908; Aethomys chrysophilus subsp. imago Thomas, 1927

= Red rock rat =

Species of rodent

The red rock rat (Aethomys chrysophilus) or red veld rat is a species of rodent in the family Muridae native to southern Africa.

== Description ==
The red rock rat is a rat-sized murine rodent. Adults have a head-body length of 12 to 17 cm (4.7 to 6.7 in), with a long, 13 to 20 cm (5.1 to 7.9 in), tail, and weigh from 40 to 114 g (1.4 to 4.0 oz). Males are not significantly larger than females. The fur on the upper body and flanks is mostly reddish-brown, but mixed with dark brown or black hairs, producing an overall colour that varies from orange-yellow or cinnamon to medium brown. The underparts are white or very pale grey, with a clear dividing line from the fur elsewhere on the body. The head is robust, with a heavy snout. Females have three pairs of teats.

Although red rock rats can be distinguished from most other species of the genus Aethomys by their size or bodily proportions, they appear essentially identical to Tete veld rats (Aethomys ineptus), and can only be reliably distinguished from them by genetic analysis or examination of the shape of their spermatozoa.

== Distribution and habitat ==
Red rock rats are widely distributed across southern Africa, although the exact southern edge of their range is difficult to determine because of their extreme physical similarity to Tete veld rats, which are found in South Africa and Eswatini. Nonetheless, red rock rats are currently believed to live in east Africa from southern Kenya, through eastern Tanzania, Malawi, Mozambique, and Zimbabwe to the north-eastern border regions of South Africa. Further west, they are found through most of Zambia and Botswana to northern Namibia and south-western Angola, although it has been suggested that the Namibian populations may be A. ineptus.

Across this region, red rock rats inhabit savannah or woodland areas with dense vegetation or rocky cover below 1,000 m (3,300 ft) elevation. They are often associated with miombo and mopane forest, but appear able to tolerate a wide range of habitats, so long as substantial ground cover is available.

Although at least seven subspecies of red rock rats have been identified, the validity of some of these is questionable, not least because of potential confusion with Tete veld rats in earlier works. Fossils indistinguishable from the modern species have been found which are dated as far back as 3.7 million years ago, in the late Pliocene of South Africa.

== Biology and behaviour ==
Red rock rats are nocturnal and omnivorous, but feed mainly on plant matter, such as seeds, fruit, green leaves, and starchy roots. They shelter through the day in cup-like nests constructed in burrows, rock crevices, or termite mounds. In the wild, they appear territorial, reacting aggressively to intruders of their own species, but they are apparently able to tolerate each other after some time in captivity, establishing a stable dominance hierarchy.

Within any given area, red rock rats are usually present in relatively low numbers, but their population turns over rapidly, increasing rapidly during the wet season, with population densities reaching up to 6 per hectare (2.4/acre), then crashing to 0.2 per hectare (0.081/acre) or less in the hot, dry, season.

In the wild, they breed during the rainy season, typically between October and January, although they are capable of breeding at any time of year in captivity. Gestation lasts 29 days, and results in the birth of between one and five, but typically three, young. The young are initially blind and helpless, with thin black fur over most of the body, and naked undersides. The teeth are already erupted at birth, and the eyes open after 10 to 14 days. Newborn young weigh only around 5 g (0.18 oz), and measure 4 cm (1.6 in) in head-body length, but they grow rapidly, being weaned between 24 and 33 days, by which time they have already attained the adult coat and general appearance.

The young attain the full adult dimensions at around seven weeks, although they may still be somewhat lighter than fully grown adults at this point. They reach sexual maturity at around 82 days, but may not give birth to their first litter for up to six months.
