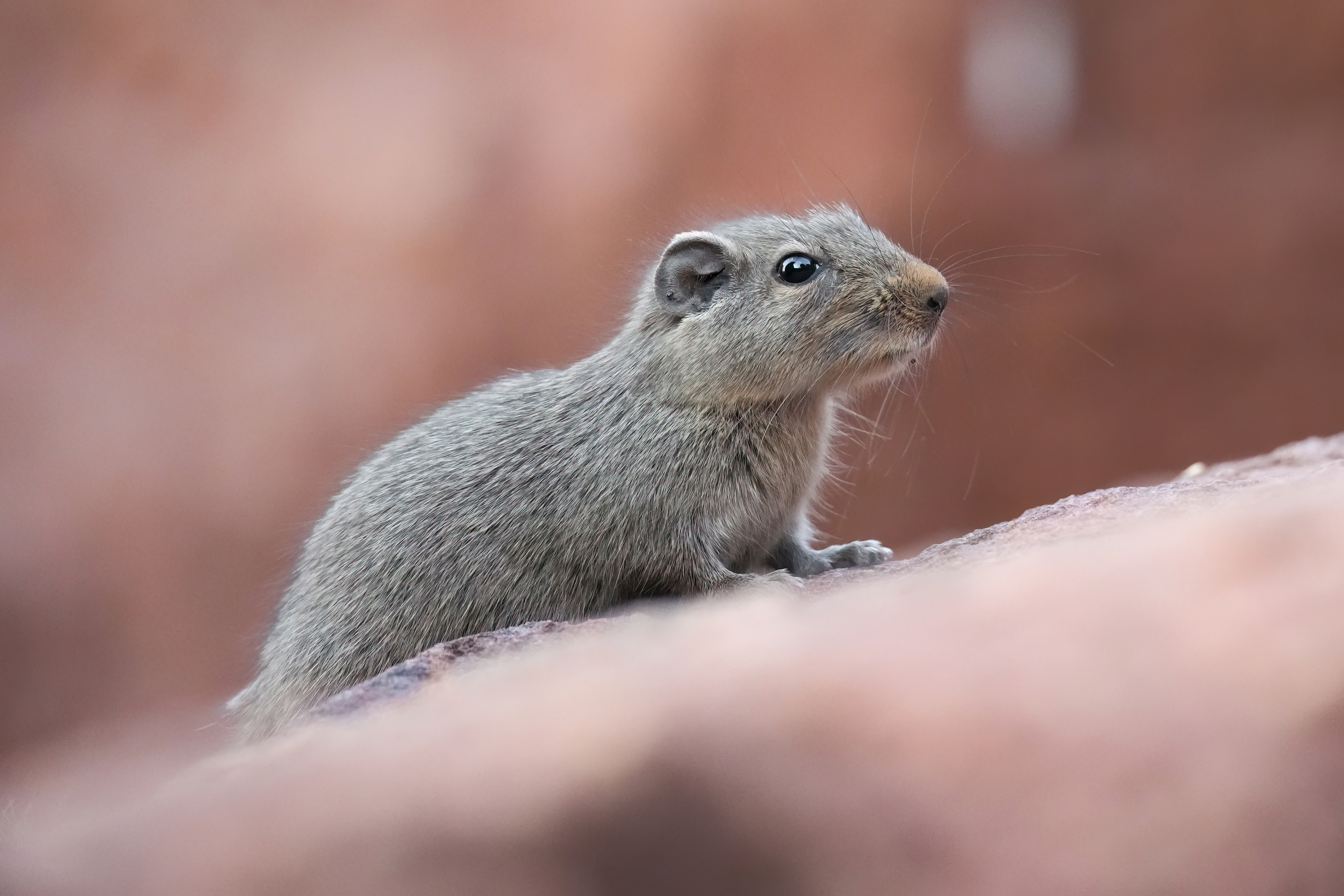

Conservation status
- Least Concern (IUCN 3.1)

Scientific classification
- Kingdom: Animalia
- Phylum: Chordata
- Class: Mammalia
- Order: Rodentia
- Parvorder: Phiomorpha
- Family: Petromuridae
- Genus: Petromus
- Species: P. typicus

Binomial name
- Petromus typicus A. Smith, 1831
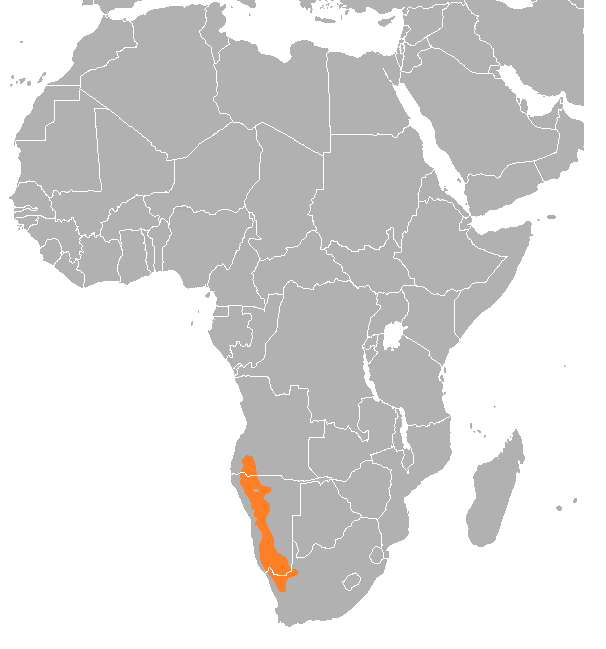

= Dassie rat =

Dassie rat Temporal range: Pleistocene–Recent

Species of rodent

The dassie rat or noki (Petromus typicus) is a diurnal African rodent native to rocky outcrops in Namibia, parts of Angola, and northwestern South Africa. It is the only living member of its genus, Petromus, and family, Petromuridae. Key features of the dassie rat include a flattened skull and flexible ribs, allowing it to squeeze into extremely narrow rock crevices. The name "dassie" means "hyrax" in Afrikaans, (Note: dassie rats are not to be confused with Cape hyraxes, which are also called dassies and are not rodents.) and the two animals are found in similar habitats.

Petromus means "rock mouse" and dassie rats are one of many rodents sometimes called rock rats. The family and genus names are sometimes misspelled as Petromyidae and Petromys. The species is currently listed as Least Concern by the IUCN.

== Characteristics ==
Dassie rats are squirrel-like in appearance. Their tails are hairy, but not bushy, whereas the soles of their feet are distinctly bare and have pads. Their skull is flattened and their ribs are flexible which helps them to squeeze into tiny rock crevices. Their cheek teeth have two raised ridges that help grind plant material. Their chewing involves a vertical up-and-down motion rather than the typical transverse side-to-side grinding of grazers. The overall coloration can be a range of browns, greys, or almost black. The nose is yellowish and tends to stand out. They have no underfur. The teats are located on the sides of the torso, which allows the young to feed from the side when crammed in a narrow rock crevice.

== Distribution and habitat ==
In South Africa

Dassie rats live in rocky areas in Namibia, southwestern Angola, and northwestern South Africa. They spend most of their time on or near rock outcrops, where they hide in cracks or crevices to avoid predators.

== Diet ==
Dassie rats are generalist herbivores, eating grasses, leaves, stems, flowers, fruits, and seeds. Studies show that they refuse insects, even when offered, which suggest they do not eat animal matter. They prefer high-fiber grasses when given a choice.

== Digestive system ==
Dassie rats digest tough plant material in the hindgut, particularly in a large cecum where bacteria help break down fiber. They have a simple, single-chambered stomach and do not ruminate. They produce two different feces: dry pellets or soft nutrient-rich pellets. They re-eat the soft pellets to recover vitamins and nutrients.

== Behavior ==
Dassie rats are active during the day and often sun themselves on rocks. They use their front feet to hold and handle food. They sometimes stand upright, and males may bend forward for grooming. Dassie rats are socially monogamous. A male and female form a long-term pair and share the same home range. Both partners help defend their territory and use the same rock shelter.

== Reproduction ==
The species usually produces one well-developed baby each year. Both parents take part in caring for the young. Births tend to occur during times when food is more available.

== Relatives ==
Dassie rats are the only remaining members of a once-diverse family that first appeared in the Oligocene of Africa. Both morphological and molecular studies suggest the closest living relatives to the dassie rats are the African cane rats in the family Thryonomyidae. These two families, along with related fossil families such as †Phiomyidae, represented an important early radiation of rodents in Africa.
