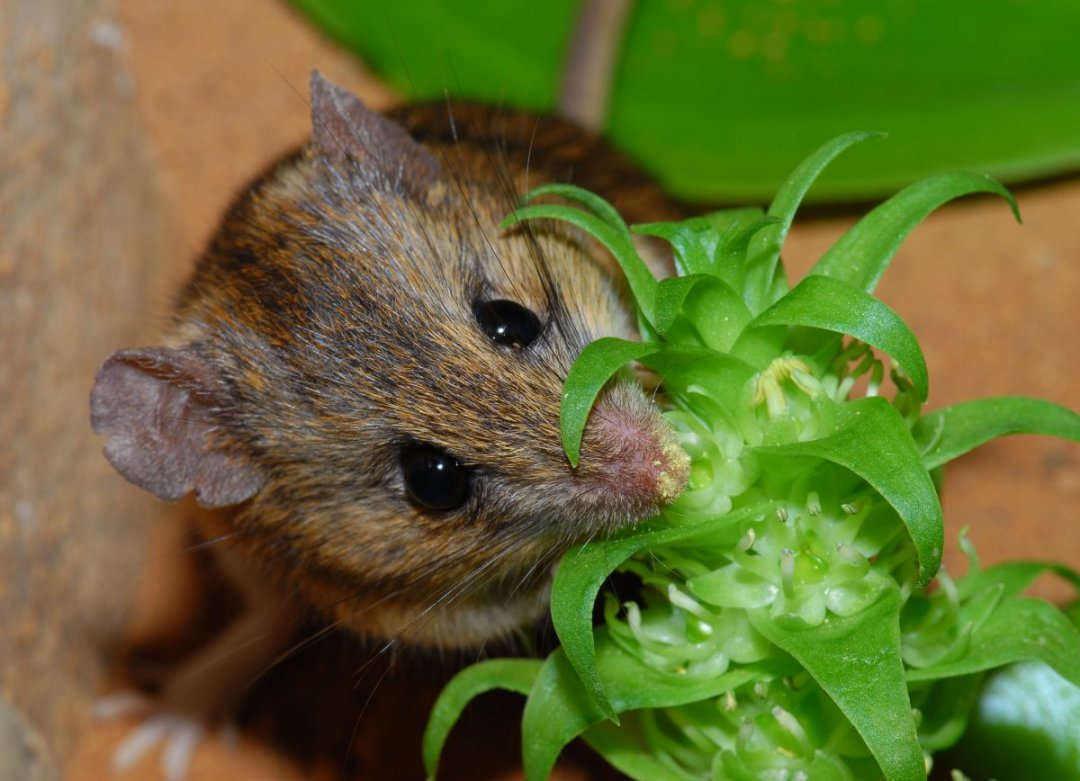
- Namaqua rock rat (Aethomys namaquensis)

Scientific classification
- Domain: Eukaryota
- Kingdom: Animalia
- Phylum: Chordata
- Class: Mammalia
- Order: Rodentia
- Family: Muridae
- Tribe: Arvicanthini
- Genus: Aethomys; Thomas, 1915

Type species
- Epimys hindei Thomas, 1902

Species
- Aethomys bocagei Aethomys chrysophilus Aethomys granti Aethomys hindei Aethomys ineptus Aethomys kaiseri Aethomys namaquensis Aethomys nyikae Aethomys silindensis Aethomys stannarius Aethomys thomasi

= Aethomys =

Aethomys Temporal range: Early Pliocene to Recent

Genus of rodents

Aethomys is a genus of rodent from Africa. They are commonly referred to as rock rats, bush rats or rock mice.

== Species ==
- Genus Aethomys
  - Aethomys bocagei – Bocage's rock rat (Thomas, 1904)
  - Aethomys chrysophilus – red rock rat (de Winton, 1897)
  - Aethomys granti – Grant's rock rat (Wroughton, 1908)
  - Aethomys hindei – Hinde's rock rat (Thomas, 1902)
  - Aethomys ineptus – Tete Veld aethomys (Thomas & Wroughton, 1908)
  - Aethomys kaiseri – Kaiser's rock rat (Noack, 1887)
  - Aethomys namaquensis – Namaqua rock rat (A. Smith, 1834)
  - Aethomys nyikae – Nyika rock rat (Thomas, 1897)
  - Aethomys silindensis – Silinda rock rat (Roberts, 1938)
  - Aethomys stannarius – Tinfield's rock rat (Thomas, 1913)
  - Aethomys thomasi – Thomas's rock rat (de Winton, 1897)
