= Thomas's rock rat =

Conservation status
- Least Concern (IUCN 3.1)

Scientific classification
- Kingdom: Animalia
- Phylum: Chordata
- Class: Mammalia
- Order: Rodentia
- Family: Muridae
- Genus: Aethomys
- Species: A. thomasi

Binomial name
- Aethomys thomasi (de Winton, 1897)

Species of rodent

Thomas's rock rat (Aethomys thomasi) is a species of rodent in the family Muridae found only in Angola. Its natural habitat is subtropical or tropical dry shrubland.
