= Bocage's rock rat =

Conservation status
- Least Concern (IUCN 3.1)

Scientific classification
- Kingdom: Animalia
- Phylum: Chordata
- Class: Mammalia
- Order: Rodentia
- Family: Muridae
- Genus: Aethomys
- Species: A. bocagei

Binomial name
- Aethomys bocagei (Thomas, 1904)

Species of rodent

Bocage's rock rat (Aethomys bocagei) is a species of rodent in the family Muridae.

It is found in Angola and Democratic Republic of the Congo.

Its natural habitats are subtropical or tropical dry forests, dry savanna, and moist savanna.
