= List of crocidurines =

Species in mammal subfamily Crocidurinae

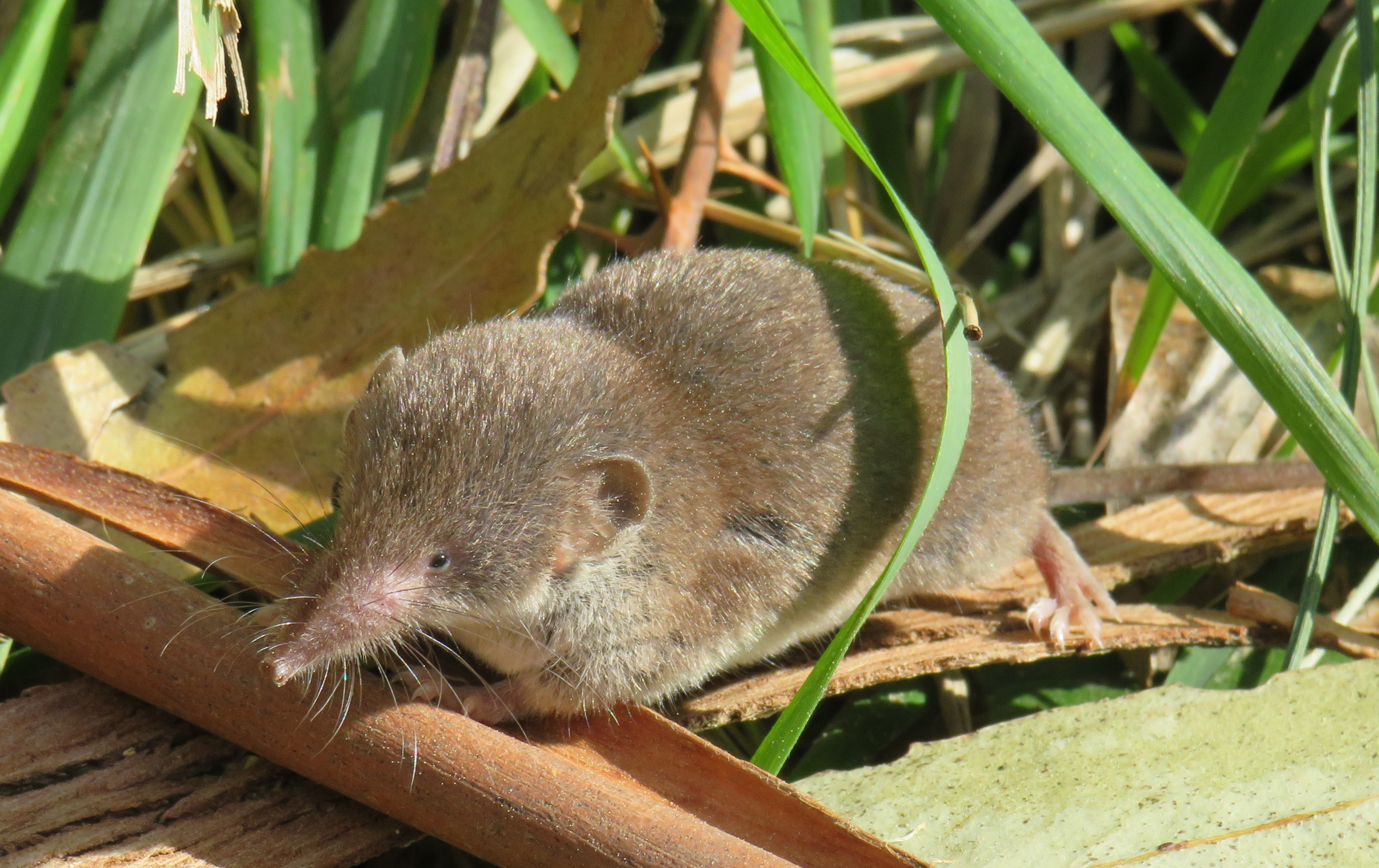
Greater white-toothed shrew (Crocidura russula)

Crocidurinae is a subfamily of small mammals in the shrew family Soricidae, which in turn is part of the order Eulipotyphla. A member of this family is called a crocidurine, or a white-toothed shrew. Crocidurinae is one of three subfamilies in Soricidae, along with the African shrews of Myosoricinae and the red-toothed shrews of Soricinae. They are found in Africa, Europe, and Asia, primarily in forests, savannas, shrublands, and grasslands, though some species can also be found in wetlands, rocky areas, or coastal areas. They range in size from the Etruscan shrew, one of the smallest mammal species at 3 cm (1 in) plus a 2 cm (1 in) tail, to the goliath shrew, at 18 cm (7 in) plus a 14 cm (6 in) tail. Crocidurines primarily eat invertebrates, small mammals, frogs, toads, and lizards. Almost no crocidurines have population estimates, but 25 species are categorized as endangered species, while the Andaman shrew, Harenna shrew, Jenkins's shrew, and Nicobar shrew are categorized as critically endangered, and the Christmas Island shrew was declared extinct in 2025.

The 244 extant species of Crocidurinae are divided into nine genera; 202 of them are in Crocidura, the most species of any mammal genus. A few extinct prehistoric Crocidurinae species have been discovered, though due to ongoing research and discoveries the exact number and categorization is not fixed.

== Conventions ==
IUCN Red List categories
Conservation status
- EX: Extinct (1 species)
- EW: Extinct in the wild (0 species)
- CR: Critically endangered (4 species)
- EN: Endangered (25 species)
- VU: Vulnerable (18 species)
- NT: Near threatened (11 species)
- LC: Least concern (134 species)

Other categories
- DD: Data deficient (52 species)
- NE: Not evaluated (0 species)

The author citation for the species or genus is given after the scientific name; parentheses around the author citation indicate that this was not the original taxonomic placement. Conservation status codes listed follow the International Union for Conservation of Nature (IUCN) Red List of Threatened Species. Range maps are provided wherever possible; if a range map is not available, a description of the crocidurine's range is provided. Ranges are based on the IUCN Red List for that species unless otherwise noted. All extinct genera or species listed alongside extant species went extinct after 1500 CE, and are indicated by a dagger symbol "†".

== Classification ==
The subfamily Crocidurinae consists of nine genera: Crocidura, containing 202 extant species; Diplomesodon and Feroculus with a single species each; Paracrocidura, with three species; Ruwenzorisorex, with one species; Scutisorex, containing two species; Solisorex, with one species, Suncus, containing nineteen species; and Sylvisorex, containing fifteen species.

Subfamily Crocidurinae

- Genus Crocidura (white-toothed shrews): 203 species (1 extinct)
- Genus Diplomesodon (piebald shrew): one species
- Genus Feroculus (Kelaart's long-clawed shrew): one species
- Genus Paracrocidura (large-headed shrews): three species
- Genus Ruwenzorisorex (Ruwenzori shrew): one species
- Genus Scutisorex (hero shrews): two species
- Genus Solisorex (Pearson's long-clawed shrew): one species
- Genus Suncus (musk shrews and pygmy shrews): nineteen species
- Genus Sylvisorex (forest shrews): fifteen species

- Crocidurinae
  - - - - Crocidura
        - Diplomesodon
        - Paracrocidura
      - Suncus
    - - - Ruwenzorisorex
        - Scutisorex
      - Sylvisorex
  - - Feroculus
    - Solisorex

== Crocidurines ==
The following classification is based on the taxonomy described by the reference work Mammal Species of the World (2005), with augmentation by generally accepted proposals made since using molecular phylogenetic analysis, as supported by both the IUCN and the American Society of Mammalogists.

Genus Crocidura – Wagler, 1832 – 203 species
Common name	Scientific name and subspecies	Range	Size and ecology	IUCN status and estimated population
African black shrew	C. nigrofusca Matschie, 1895	Central and eastern Africa	Size: 4–18 cm (2–7 in) long, plus 4–11 cm (2–4 in) tail Habitat: Forest Diet: Invertebrates, small mammals, frogs, toads, and lizards	LC Unknown
African dusky shrew	C. caliginea Hollister, 1916	Central Africa	Size: 6–8 cm (2–3 in) long, plus 4–6 cm (2 in) tail Habitat: Forest Diet: Invertebrates, small mammals, frogs, toads, and lizards	LC Unknown
African giant shrew	C. olivieri (Lesson, 1827) 20 subspecies: C. o. anchietae; C. o. bueae; C. o. cara; C. o. cinereoaenea; C. o. darfurea; C. o. giffardi; C. o. guineensis; C. o. hansruppi; C. o. hedenborgiana; C. o. kivu; C. o. manni; C. o. martiensseni; C. o. nyansae; C. o. occidentalis; C. o. odorata; C. o. olivieri; C. o. spurelli; C. o. sururae; C. o. toritensis; C. o. zuleika	Sub-Saharan Africa	Size: 11–14 cm (4–6 in) long, plus 8–10 cm (3–4 in) tail Habitat: Forest, savanna, and shrubland Diet: Invertebrates	LC Unknown
Andaman shrew	C. andamanensis Miller, 1902	South Andaman Island in India	Size: 4–18 cm (2–7 in) long, plus 4–11 cm (2–4 in) tail Habitat: Forest Diet: Invertebrates, small mammals, frogs, toads, and lizards	CR Unknown
Andaman spiny shrew	C. hispida Thomas, 1913	South Andaman Island in India	Size: 4–18 cm (2–7 in) long, plus 4–11 cm (2–4 in) tail Habitat: Forest Diet: Invertebrates, small mammals, frogs, toads, and lizards	VU Unknown
Annamite shrew	C. annamitensis Jenkins, Lunde, & Moncrieff, 2009	Vietnam	Size: 4–18 cm (2–7 in) long, plus 4–11 cm (2–4 in) tail Habitat: Forest Diet: Invertebrates, small mammals, frogs, toads, and lizards	DD Unknown
Ansell's shrew	C. ansellorum Hutterer & Dippenaar, 1987	South-central Africa	Size: 5–6 cm (2–2 in) long, plus 4–6 cm (2 in) tail Habitat: Forest Diet: Invertebrates, small mammals, frogs, toads, and lizards	EN Unknown
Arabian shrew	C. arabica Hutterer, 1988	Oman and Yemen	Size: 4–18 cm (2–7 in) long, plus 4–11 cm (2–4 in) tail Habitat: Unknown Diet: Invertebrates, small mammals, frogs, toads, and lizards	LC Unknown
Armenian shrew	C. armenica Gureev, 1963	Armenia	Size: 4–18 cm (2–7 in) long, plus 4–11 cm (2–4 in) tail Habitat: Rocky areas Diet: Invertebrates, small mammals, frogs, toads, and lizards	DD Unknown
Asian gray shrew	C. attenuata H. Milne-Edwards, 1872	Eastern and southeastern Asia	Size: 4–18 cm (2–7 in) long, plus 4–11 cm (2–4 in) tail Habitat: Forest, shrubland, and grassland Diet: Invertebrates, small mammals, frogs, toads, and lizards	LC Unknown
Asian lesser white-toothed shrew	C. shantungensis Miller, 1901 Two subspecies: C. s. quelpartis; C. s. shantungensis	Eastern Asia	Size: 4–18 cm (2–7 in) long, plus 4–11 cm (2–4 in) tail Habitat: Shrubland and grassland Diet: Invertebrates, small mammals, frogs, toads, and lizards	LC Unknown
Bailey's shrew	C. baileyi Osgood, 1936	Ethiopia	Size: 4–18 cm (2–7 in) long, plus 4–11 cm (2–4 in) tail Habitat: Grassland Diet: Invertebrates, small mammals, frogs, toads, and lizards	LC Unknown
Bale shrew	C. bottegoides Hutterer & Yalden, 1990	Ethiopia	Size: 4–6 cm (2 in) long, plus 4–5 cm (2 in) tail Habitat: Grassland and forest Diet: Invertebrates, small mammals, frogs, toads, and lizards	EN Unknown
Balete's white-toothed shrew	C. baletei Esselstyn, Achmadi, Handika, Swanson, Giarla, & Rowe, 2021	Sulawesi island in Indonesia	Size: 6–7 cm (2–3 in) long, plus 4–6 cm (2–2 in) tail Habitat: Forest Diet: Invertebrates, small mammals, frogs, toads, and lizards	NT Unknown
Banka shrew	C. vosmaeri Jentink, 1888	Bangka Island in Indonesia	Size: 4–18 cm (2–7 in) long, plus 4–11 cm (2–4 in) tail Habitat: Forest Diet: Invertebrates, small mammals, frogs, toads, and lizards	DD Unknown
Batak shrew	C. batakorum Hutterer, 2007	Philippines	Size: 4–18 cm (2–7 in) long, plus 4–11 cm (2–4 in) tail Habitat: Forest Diet: Invertebrates, small mammals, frogs, toads, and lizards	DD Unknown
Bates's shrew	C. batesi (Dollman, 1915)	Western Africa	Size: 4–18 cm (2–7 in) long, plus 4–11 cm (2–4 in) tail Habitat: Forest Diet: Invertebrates, small mammals, frogs, toads, and lizards	LC Unknown
Beccari's shrew	C. beccarii Dobson, 1886	Sumatra	Size: 4–18 cm (2–7 in) long, plus 4–11 cm (2–4 in) tail Habitat: Forest Diet: Invertebrates, small mammals, frogs, toads, and lizards	LC Unknown
Beletta shrew	C. yaldeni Lavrenchenko, Voyta, & Hutterer, 2016	Ethiopia	Size: 4–18 cm (2–7 in) long, plus 4–11 cm (2–4 in) tail Habitat: Forest Diet: Invertebrates, small mammals, frogs, toads, and lizards	DD Unknown
Bicolored musk shrew	C. fuscomurina (Heuglin, 1865)	Sub-Saharan Africa	Size: 4–8 cm (2–3 in) long, plus 2–5 cm (1–2 in) tail Habitat: Savanna, grassland, and desert Diet: Invertebrates, small mammals, frogs, toads, and lizards	LC Unknown
Bicolored shrew	C. leucodon (Hermann, 1780)	Europe and western Asia	Size: 6–9 cm (2–4 in) long, plus 2–5 cm (1–2 in) tail Habitat: Shrubland and grassland Diet: Small mammals, frogs, toads, lizards, and invertebrates	LC Unknown
Black-footed shrew	C. nigripes Miller & Hollister, 1921 Two subspecies: C. n. lipara; C. n. nigripes	Sulawesi island in Indonesia	Size: 4–18 cm (2–7 in) long, plus 4–11 cm (2–4 in) tail Habitat: Forest Diet: Invertebrates, small mammals, frogs, toads, and lizards	LC Unknown
Blackish white-toothed shrew	C. nigricans Bocage, 1889	Angola	Size: 6–9 cm (2–4 in) long, plus 4–7 cm (2–3 in) tail Habitat: Unknown Diet: Invertebrates, small mammals, frogs, toads, and lizards	LC Unknown
Bornean shrew	C. foetida Peters, 1870 Three subspecies: C. f. doriae; C. f. foetida; C. f. kelabit	Borneo	Size: 4–18 cm (2–7 in) long, plus 4–11 cm (2–4 in) tail Habitat: Forest Diet: Invertebrates, small mammals, frogs, toads, and lizards	LC Unknown
Bottego's shrew	C. bottegi Thomas, 1898	Ethiopia	Size: 4–6 cm (2 in) long, plus 2–3 cm (1 in) tail Habitat: Unknown Diet: Invertebrates, small mammals, frogs, toads, and lizards	DD Unknown
Buettikofer's shrew	C. buettikoferi Jentink, 1888	West-central Africa	Size: 7–10 cm (3–4 in) long, plus 5–7 cm (2–3 in) tail Habitat: Forest Diet: Invertebrates, small mammals, frogs, toads, and lizards	LC Unknown
Butiaba naked-tailed shrew	C. littoralis Heller, 1910	Central Africa	Size: 8–10 cm (3–4 in) long, plus 6–8 cm (2–3 in) tail Habitat: Forest Diet: Invertebrates, small mammals, frogs, toads, and lizards	LC Unknown
Cameroonian shrew	C. picea Sanderson, 1940	West-central Africa	Size: 4–18 cm (2–7 in) long, plus 4–11 cm (2–4 in) tail Habitat: Forest and grassland Diet: Invertebrates, small mammals, frogs, toads, and lizards	EN Unknown
Canarian shrew	C. canariensis Hutterer, López-Jurado, & Vogel, 1987	Canary Islands	Size: 4–18 cm (2–7 in) long, plus 4–11 cm (2–4 in) tail Habitat: Coastal marine, desert, and shrubland Diet: Snails and insects	EN Unknown
Caspian shrew	C. caspica Thomas, 1907	Iran and Azerbaijan	Size: 4–18 cm (2–7 in) long, plus 4–11 cm (2–4 in) tail Habitat: Unknown Diet: Invertebrates, small mammals, frogs, toads, and lizards	DD Unknown
Chinese white-toothed shrew	C. rapax Allen, 1923 Four subspecies: C. r. kurodai; C. r. lutaoensis; C. r. rapax; C. r. tadae	Eastern Asia	Size: 4–18 cm (2–7 in) long, plus 4–11 cm (2–4 in) tail Habitat: Unknown Diet: Invertebrates, small mammals, frogs, toads, and lizards	DD Unknown
Christmas Island shrew †	C. trichura Dobson, 1889	Christmas Island	Size: 4–18 cm (2–7 in) long, plus 4–11 cm (2–4 in) tail Habitat: Forest Diet: Invertebrates, small mammals, frogs, toads, and lizards	EX 0
Cinderella shrew	C. cinderella Thomas, 1911	Western Africa	Size: 5–7 cm (2–3 in) long, plus 4–5 cm (2–2 in) tail Habitat: Savanna Diet: Invertebrates, small mammals, frogs, toads, and lizards	LC Unknown
Congo white-toothed shrew	C. congobelgica Hollister, 1916	Central Africa	Size: 4–18 cm (2–7 in) long, plus 4–11 cm (2–4 in) tail Habitat: Forest Diet: Invertebrates, small mammals, frogs, toads, and lizards	LC Unknown
Cranbrook's white-toothed shrew	C. cranbrooki Jenkins, Lunde, & Moncrieff, 2009	Northern Myanmar	Size: 4–18 cm (2–7 in) long, plus 4–11 cm (2–4 in) tail Habitat: Forest Diet: Invertebrates, small mammals, frogs, toads, and lizards	DD Unknown
Cretan shrew	C. zimmermanni Wettstein, 1953	Island of Crete in Greece	Size: 4–18 cm (2–7 in) long, plus 4–11 cm (2–4 in) tail Habitat: Unknown and rocky areas Diet: Invertebrates, small mammals, frogs, toads, and lizards	EN Unknown
Crosse's shrew	C. crossei Thomas, 1895	Western Africa	Size: 6–7 cm (2–3 in) long, plus 4–6 cm (2 in) tail Habitat: Forest Diet: Invertebrates, small mammals, frogs, toads, and lizards	LC Unknown
Cyrenaica shrew	C. aleksandrisi Vesmanis, 1977	Northern Libya	Size: 5–7 cm (2–3 in) long, plus 3–5 cm (1–2 in) tail Habitat: Shrubland Diet: Invertebrates, small mammals, frogs, toads, and lizards	LC Unknown
Dark white-toothed shrew	C. tenebrosa Esselstyn, Achmadi, Handika, Swanson, Giarla, & Rowe, 2021	Sulawesi island in Indonesia	Size: 6–7 cm (2–3 in) long, plus 3–5 cm (1–2 in) tail Habitat: Forest Diet: Invertebrates, small mammals, frogs, toads, and lizards	VU Unknown
Dent's shrew	C. denti Dollman, 1915	Western and central Africa	Size: About 6 cm (2 in) long, plus 5 cm (2 in) tail Habitat: Forest and savanna Diet: Invertebrates, small mammals, frogs, toads, and lizards	LC Unknown
Desert musk shrew	C. smithii Thomas, 1895 Two subspecies: C. s. debalsaci; C. s. smithii	Western and Eastern Africa	Size: 6–9 cm (2–4 in) long, plus 3–6 cm (1–2 in) tail Habitat: Savanna Diet: Invertebrates, small mammals, frogs, toads, and lizards	LC Unknown
Desperate shrew	C. desperata Hutterer, Jenkins, & Verheyen, 1991	Tanzania	Size: 8–11 cm (3–4 in) long, plus about 7 cm (3 in) tail Habitat: Forest Diet: Invertebrates, small mammals, frogs, toads, and lizards	VU Unknown
Dhofar shrew	C. dhofarensis (Hutterer, 1988)	Yemen and Oman	Size: 4–18 cm (2–7 in) long, plus 4–11 cm (2–4 in) tail Habitat: Unknown Diet: Invertebrates, small mammals, frogs, toads, and lizards	DD Unknown
Doucet's musk shrew	C. douceti Heim de Balsac, 1958	Western Africa	Size: 4–18 cm (2–7 in) long, plus 4–11 cm (2–4 in) tail Habitat: Forest Diet: Invertebrates, small mammals, frogs, toads, and lizards	LC Unknown
Dsinezumi shrew	C. dsinezumi (Temminck, 1842)	Japan	Size: 4–18 cm (2–7 in) long, plus 4–11 cm (2–4 in) tail Habitat: Shrubland, grassland, and inland wetlands Diet: Invertebrates, small mammals, frogs, toads, and lizards	LC Unknown
East African highland shrew	C. allex Osgood, 1910	Kenya and Tanzania	Size: 5–7 cm (2–3 in) long, plus 4–6 cm (2 in) tail Habitat: Grassland and inland wetlands Diet: Invertebrates, small mammals, frogs, toads, and lizards	LC Unknown
Egyptian pygmy shrew	C. religiosa (Geoffroy, 1827)	Northern Egypt	Size: 4–7 cm (2–3 in) long, plus 2–4 cm (1–2 in) tail Habitat: Diet: Invertebrates, small mammals, frogs, toads, and lizards	DD Unknown
Eisentraut's shrew	C. eisentrauti Heim de Balsac, 1957	Cameroon	Size: 4–18 cm (2–7 in) long, plus 4–11 cm (2–4 in) tail Habitat: Grassland and forest Diet: Invertebrates, small mammals, frogs, toads, and lizards	VU Unknown
Elgon shrew	C. elgonius Osgood, 1910	Kenya and Tanzania	Size: 4–18 cm (2–7 in) long, plus 4–11 cm (2–4 in) tail Habitat: Forest Diet: Invertebrates, small mammals, frogs, toads, and lizards	LC Unknown
Elongated shrew	C. elongata Miller & Hollister, 1921	Sulawesi island in Indonesia	Size: 4–18 cm (2–7 in) long, plus 4–11 cm (2–4 in) tail Habitat: Forest and shrubland Diet: Invertebrates, small mammals, frogs, toads, and lizards	LC Unknown
Fingui white-toothed shrew	C. fingui Ceríaco et al., 2015	Príncipe in São Tomé and Príncipe	Size: 4–18 cm (2–7 in) long, plus 4–11 cm (2–4 in) tail Habitat: Forest Diet: Invertebrates, small mammals, frogs, toads, and lizards	DD Unknown
Fischer's shrew	C. fischeri Pagenstecher, 1885	Kenya and Tanzania	Size: 6–10 cm (2–4 in) long, plus 4–6 cm (2 in) tail Habitat: Savanna Diet: Invertebrates, small mammals, frogs, toads, and lizards	DD Unknown
Flat-headed shrew	C. planiceps Heller, 1910	West-central Africa	Size: 4–18 cm (2–7 in) long, plus 4–11 cm (2–4 in) tail Habitat: Inland wetlands Diet: Invertebrates, small mammals, frogs, toads, and lizards	DD Unknown
Flower's shrew	C. floweri Dollman, 1915	Northern Egypt	Size: 5–8 cm (2–3 in) long, plus 5–6 cm (2–2 in) tail Habitat: Artificial terrain Diet: Invertebrates, small mammals, frogs, toads, and lizards	DD Unknown
Fox's shrew	C. foxi Dollman, 1915	Western and central Africa	Size: 9–12 cm (4–5 in) long, plus 5–8 cm (2–3 in) tail Habitat: Savanna and forest Diet: Invertebrates, small mammals, frogs, toads, and lizards	LC Unknown
Fraser's musk shrew	C. poensis (Fraser, 1843)	Western Africa	Size: 7–10 cm (3–4 in) long, plus 4–7 cm (2–3 in) tail Habitat: Shrubland and forest Diet: Arthropods and other invertebrates	LC Unknown
Gathorne's shrew	C. gathornei Jenkins, 2013	Himalayas in India	Size: 4–18 cm (2–7 in) long, plus 4–11 cm (2–4 in) tail Habitat: Shrubland and grassland Diet: Invertebrates, small mammals, frogs, toads, and lizards	DD Unknown
Glass's shrew	C. glassi Heim de Balsac, 1966	Ethiopia	Size: 6–9 cm (2–4 in) long, plus 4–6 cm (2 in)tail Habitat: Shrubland, grassland, and inland wetlands Diet: Invertebrates, small mammals, frogs, toads, and lizards	NT Unknown
Gmelin's white-toothed shrew	C. gmelini Pallas, 1811	Central Asia	Size: 4–18 cm (2–7 in) long, plus 4–11 cm (2–4 in) tail Habitat: Shrubland and grassland Diet: Invertebrates, small mammals, frogs, toads, and lizards	LC Unknown
Goliath shrew	C. goliath Thomas, 1906	Central Africa	Size: 15–18 cm (6–7 in) long, plus 10–14 cm (4–6 in) tail Habitat: Forest Diet: Invertebrates, small mammals, frogs, toads, and lizards	LC Unknown
Gracile naked-tailed shrew	C. maurisca Thomas, 1904	Central Africa	Size: 7–10 cm (3–4 in) long, plus 6–8 cm (2–3 in) tail Habitat: Inland wetlands and forest Diet: Invertebrates, small mammals, frogs, toads, and lizards	LC Unknown
Grasse's shrew	C. grassei Brosset, Dubost, & Heim de Balsac, 1965	West-central Africa	Size: 7–9 cm (3–4 in) long, plus 6–8 cm (2–3 in) tail Habitat: Forest Diet: Invertebrates, small mammals, frogs, toads, and lizards	LC Unknown
Greater Mindanao shrew	C. grandis Miller, 1911	Philippines	Size: 4–18 cm (2–7 in) long, plus 4–11 cm (2–4 in) tail Habitat: Forest Diet: Invertebrates, small mammals, frogs, toads, and lizards	DD Unknown
Greater red musk shrew	C. flavescens (Geoffroy, 1827)	Southern Africa	Size: 8–12 cm (3–5 in) long, plus 3–6 cm (1–2 in) tail Habitat: Savanna and grassland Diet: Invertebrates, small mammals, frogs, toads, and lizards	LC Unknown
Greater white-toothed shrew	C. russula (Hermann, 1780)	Europe and northwestern Africa	Size: 6–9 cm (2–4 in) long, plus 3–5 cm (1–2 in) tail Habitat: Shrubland Diet: Invertebrates, as well as small mammals and small lizards	LC Unknown
Greenwood's shrew	C. greenwoodi Heim de Balsac, 1966	Somalia	Size: 4–18 cm (2–7 in) long, plus 4–11 cm (2–4 in) tail Habitat: Forest, savanna, and shrubland Diet: Invertebrates, small mammals, frogs, toads, and lizards	LC Unknown
Guramba shrew	C. phaeura Osgood, 1936	Ethiopia	Size: 4–18 cm (2–7 in) long, plus 4–11 cm (2–4 in) tail Habitat: Forest Diet: Invertebrates, small mammals, frogs, toads, and lizards	EN Unknown
Guy's shrew	C. guy Jenkins, Lunde, & Moncrieff, 2009	Vietnam	Size: 4–18 cm (2–7 in) long, plus 4–11 cm (2–4 in) tail Habitat: Forest Diet: Invertebrates, small mammals, frogs, toads, and lizards	DD Unknown
Güldenstädt's shrew	C. gueldenstaedtii (Pallas, 1811)	Europe and western Asia	Size: 4–18 cm (2–7 in) long, plus 4–11 cm (2–4 in) tail Habitat: Shrubland, grassland, inland wetlands, rocky areas, intertidal marine, and coastal marine Diet: Insects, as well as molluscs, amphipods, annelids, and small vertebrates	LC Unknown
Hainan Island shrew	C. wuchihensis Sung, 1966	Southern China and northern Vietnam	Size: 4–18 cm (2–7 in) long, plus 4–11 cm (2–4 in) tail Habitat: Forest Diet: Invertebrates, small mammals, frogs, toads, and lizards	DD Unknown
Harenna shrew	C. harenna Hutterer & Yalden, 1990	Ethiopia	Size: 4–18 cm (2–7 in) long, plus 4–11 cm (2–4 in) tail Habitat: Forest Diet: Invertebrates, small mammals, frogs, toads, and lizards	CR Unknown
Heather shrew	C. erica Dollman, 1915	Angola	Size: About 10 cm (4 in) long, plus 5 cm (2 in) tail Habitat: Unknown Diet: Invertebrates, small mammals, frogs, toads, and lizards	DD Unknown
Hildegarde's shrew	C. hildegardeae Thomas, 1904	Central Africa	Size: 6–8 cm (2–3 in) long, plus 3–6 cm (1–2 in) tail Habitat: Forest Diet: Invertebrates, small mammals, frogs, toads, and lizards	LC Unknown
Hill's shrew	C. hilliana Jenkins & Smith, 1995	Thailand and Laos	Size: 4–18 cm (2–7 in) long, plus 4–11 cm (2–4 in) tail Habitat: Forest and shrubland Diet: Invertebrates, small mammals, frogs, toads, and lizards	DD Unknown
Horsfield's shrew	C. horsfieldii (Tomes, 1856)	Scattered southern Asia	Size: 4–18 cm (2–7 in) long, plus 4–11 cm (2–4 in) tail Habitat: Forest Diet: Invertebrates, small mammals, frogs, toads, and lizards	DD Unknown
Hun shrew	C. attila Dollman, 1915	Central Africa	Size: 4–18 cm (2–7 in) long, plus 4–11 cm (2–4 in) tail Habitat: Forest Diet: Invertebrates, small mammals, frogs, toads, and lizards	LC Unknown
Hutan shrew	C. hutanis Ruedi & Vogel, 1995	Sumatra island in Indonesia	Size: 4–18 cm (2–7 in) long, plus 4–11 cm (2–4 in) tail Habitat: Forest Diet: Invertebrates, small mammals, frogs, toads, and lizards	LC Unknown
Indochinese shrew	C. indochinensis Kloss, 1922	Southeastern Asia	Size: 4–18 cm (2–7 in) long, plus 4–11 cm (2–4 in) tail Habitat: Forest Diet: Invertebrates, small mammals, frogs, toads, and lizards	LC Unknown
Iranian shrew	C. susiana Redding & Lay, 1978	Iran	Size: 4–18 cm (2–7 in) long, plus 4–11 cm (2–4 in) tail Habitat: Unknown Diet: Invertebrates, small mammals, frogs, toads, and lizards	DD Unknown
Jackass shrew	C. arispa Spitzenberger, 1971	Turkey	Size: 4–18 cm (2–7 in) long, plus 4–11 cm (2–4 in) tail Habitat: Rocky areas Diet: Invertebrates, small mammals, frogs, toads, and lizards	LC Unknown
Jackson's shrew	C. jacksoni Thomas, 1904	East-central Africa	Size: 5–9 cm (2–4 in) long, plus 4–7 cm (2–3 in) tail Habitat: Forest Diet: Invertebrates, small mammals, frogs, toads, and lizards	LC Unknown
Javan ghost shrew	C. umbra Demos, Achmadi, Handika, Maharadatunkamsi, Rowe, & Esselstyn, 2016	Java island in Indonesia	Size: 4–18 cm (2–7 in) long, plus 4–11 cm (2–4 in) tail Habitat: Forest Diet: Invertebrates, small mammals, frogs, toads, and lizards	NT Unknown
Javanese shrew	C. maxi Sody, 1936	Indonesia and East Timor	Size: 4–18 cm (2–7 in) long, plus 4–11 cm (2–4 in) tail Habitat: Forest Diet: Invertebrates, small mammals, frogs, toads, and lizards	LC Unknown
Jenkins's shrew	C. jenkinsi Chakraborty, 1978	South Andaman Island in India	Size: 4–18 cm (2–7 in) long, plus 4–11 cm (2–4 in) tail Habitat: Forest Diet: Invertebrates, small mammals, frogs, toads, and lizards	CR Unknown
Jouvenet's shrew	C. jouvenetae Heim de Balsac, 1958	Western Africa	Size: 6–9 cm (2–4 in) long, plus 4–7 cm (2–3 in) tail Habitat: Forest Diet: Invertebrates, small mammals, frogs, toads, and lizards	LC Unknown
Kashmir white-toothed shrew	C. pullata Miller, 1911	Northern India and Pakistan	Size: 4–18 cm (2–7 in) long, plus 4–11 cm (2–4 in) tail Habitat: Unknown Diet: Invertebrates, small mammals, frogs, toads, and lizards	LC Unknown
Katinka's shrew	C. katinka Bate, 1937	Western Asia	Size: 4–18 cm (2–7 in) long, plus 4–11 cm (2–4 in) tail Habitat: Unknown Diet: Invertebrates, small mammals, frogs, toads, and lizards	DD Unknown
Kilimanjaro shrew	C. monax Thomas, 1910	Map of range	Size: 4–18 cm (2–7 in) long, plus 4–11 cm (2–4 in) tail Habitat: Forest Diet: Invertebrates, small mammals, frogs, toads, and lizards	DD Unknown
Kinabalu shrew	C. baluensis Thomas, 1898	Northern Borneo	Size: 4–18 cm (2–7 in) long, plus 4–11 cm (2–4 in) tail Habitat: Forest, shrubland, and grassland Diet: Invertebrates, small mammals, frogs, toads, and lizards	LC Unknown
Kivu long-haired shrew	C. lanosa Heim de Balsac, 1968	Central Africa	Size: 4–18 cm (2–7 in) long, plus 4–11 cm (2–4 in) tail Habitat: Forest and inland wetlands Diet: Invertebrates, small mammals, frogs, toads, and lizards	VU Unknown
Kivu shrew	C. kivuana Heim de Balsac, 1968	Central Africa	Size: 6–9 cm (2–4 in) long, plus 6–8 cm (2–3 in) tail Habitat: Forest and inland wetlands Diet: Invertebrates, small mammals, frogs, toads, and lizards	NT Unknown
Lamotte's shrew	C. lamottei Heim de Balsac, 1968	Western Africa	Size: 8–9 cm (3–4 in) long, plus 3–6 cm (1–2 in) tail Habitat: Forest and savanna Diet: Invertebrates, small mammals, frogs, toads, and lizards	LC Unknown
Large-headed forest shrew	C. grandiceps Hutterer, 1983	Western Africa	Size: 9–12 cm (4–5 in) long, plus 5–8 cm (2–3 in) tail Habitat: Forest Diet: Invertebrates, small mammals, frogs, toads, and lizards	LC Unknown
Latona's shrew	C. latona Hollister, 1916	Democratic Republic of the Congo	Size: 4–18 cm (2–7 in) long, plus 4–11 cm (2–4 in) tail Habitat: Forest Diet: Invertebrates, small mammals, frogs, toads, and lizards	LC Unknown
Lesser Ryukyu shrew	C. watasei Kuroda, 1924	Southern Japan	Size: 4–18 cm (2–7 in) long, plus 4–11 cm (2–4 in) tail Habitat: Shrubland, grassland, and inland wetlands Diet: Invertebrates, small mammals, frogs, toads, and lizards	LC Unknown
Lesser gray-brown musk shrew	C. silacea Thomas, 1895	Southern Africa	Size: 6–8 cm (2–3 in) long, plus 4–6 cm (2 in) tail Habitat: Rocky areas, grassland, shrubland, and savanna Diet: Invertebrates, small mammals, frogs, toads, and lizards	LC Unknown
Lesser red musk shrew	C. hirta Peters, 1852	Southern and southeastern Africa	Size: 6–10 cm (2–4 in) long, plus 3–6 cm (1–2 in) tail Habitat: Savanna, grassland, and desert Diet: Invertebrates, small mammals, frogs, toads, and lizards	LC Unknown
Lesser rock shrew	C. serezkyensis Laptev, 1929	Western Asia	Size: 4–18 cm (2–7 in) long, plus 4–11 cm (2–4 in) tail Habitat: Unknown Diet: Invertebrates, small mammals, frogs, toads, and lizards	LC Unknown
Lesser white-toothed shrew	C. suaveolens (Pallas, 1811)	Europe and Asia	Size: 4–18 cm (2–7 in) long, plus 4–11 cm (2–4 in) tail Habitat: Forest, shrubland, grassland, rocky areas, and coastal/supratidal marine Diet: Invertebrates, small mammals, frogs, toads, and lizards	LC Unknown
Long-footed shrew	C. crenata Brosset, Dubost, & Heim de Balsac, 1965	West-central Africa	Size: 4–18 cm (2–7 in) long, plus 4–11 cm (2–4 in) tail Habitat: Forest Diet: Invertebrates, small mammals, frogs, toads, and lizards	LC Unknown
Long-tailed musk shrew	C. dolichura Peters, 1876	Central Africa	Size: 6–7 cm (2–3 in) long, plus 7–8 cm (3 in) tail Habitat: Forest Diet: Invertebrates, small mammals, frogs, toads, and lizards	LC Unknown
Lucina's shrew	C. lucina Dippenaar, 1980	Ethiopia	Size: 8–10 cm (3–4 in) long, plus 4–6 cm (2 in) tail Habitat: Grassland and inland wetlands Diet: Invertebrates, small mammals, frogs, toads, and lizards	VU Unknown
Ludia's shrew	C. ludia Hollister, 1916	Central Africa	Size: 6–7 cm (2–3 in) long, plus 5–6 cm (2–2 in) tail Habitat: Forest Diet: Invertebrates, small mammals, frogs, toads, and lizards	LC Unknown
Luzon shrew	C. grayi Dobson, 1890	Philippines	Size: 4–18 cm (2–7 in) long, plus 4–11 cm (2–4 in) tail Habitat: Forest Diet: Invertebrates, small mammals, frogs, toads, and lizards	LC Unknown
Lwiro shrew	C. lwiroensis Peterhans & Hutterer, 2013	Democratic Republic of the Congo	Size: 4–18 cm (2–7 in) long, plus 4–11 cm (2–4 in) tail Habitat: Forest Diet: Invertebrates, small mammals, frogs, toads, and lizards	DD Unknown
MacArthur's shrew	C. macarthuri St. Leger, 1934	Eastern Africa	Size: 4–18 cm (2–7 in) long, plus 4–11 cm (2–4 in) tail Habitat: Savanna Diet: Invertebrates, small mammals, frogs, toads, and lizards	LC Unknown
MacMillan's shrew	C. macmillani Dollman, 1915	Ethiopia	Size: 4–18 cm (2–7 in) long, plus 4–11 cm (2–4 in) tail Habitat: Forest and savanna Diet: Invertebrates, small mammals, frogs, toads, and lizards	NT Unknown
Makwassie musk shrew	C. maquassiensis Roberts, 1946	Southern Africa	Size: 5–8 cm (2–3 in) long, plus 4–5 cm (2–2 in) tail Habitat: Grassland and rocky areas Diet: Invertebrates, small mammals, frogs, toads, and lizards	LC Unknown
Malayan shrew	C. malayana Robinson & Kloss, 1911	Malaysia	Size: 4–18 cm (2–7 in) long, plus 4–11 cm (2–4 in) tail Habitat: Forest Diet: Invertebrates, small mammals, frogs, toads, and lizards	LC Unknown
Mamfe shrew	C. virgata Sanderson, 1940	West-central Africa	Size: 4–18 cm (2–7 in) long, plus 4–11 cm (2–4 in) tail Habitat: Forest and grassland Diet: Invertebrates, small mammals, frogs, toads, and lizards	LC Unknown
Manenguba shrew	C. manengubae Hutterer, 1982	West-central Africa	Size: 7–9 cm (3–4 in) long, plus 6–7 cm (2–3 in) tail Habitat: Forest, shrubland, and grassland Diet: Invertebrates, small mammals, frogs, toads, and lizards	VU Unknown
Mauritanian shrew	C. lusitania Dollman, 1915	Western and eastern Africa	Size: 4–7 cm (2–3 in) long, plus 2–4 cm (1–2 in) tail Habitat: Savanna and shrubland Diet: Invertebrates, small mammals, frogs, toads, and lizards	LC Unknown
Mduma's shrew	C. mdumai Stanley, Hutterer, Giarla, & Esselstyn, 2015	Tanzania	Size: 4–18 cm (2–7 in) long, plus 4–11 cm (2–4 in) tail Habitat: Forest Diet: Invertebrates, small mammals, frogs, toads, and lizards	EN Unknown
Mindanao shrew	C. beatus Miller, 1910	Philippines	Size: 4–18 cm (2–7 in) long, plus 4–11 cm (2–4 in) tail Habitat: Forest Diet: Invertebrates, small mammals, frogs, toads, and lizards	LC Unknown
Mindoro shrew	C. mindorus Miller, 1910	Philippines	Size: 4–18 cm (2–7 in) long, plus 4–11 cm (2–4 in) tail Habitat: Forest Diet: Invertebrates, small mammals, frogs, toads, and lizards	DD Unknown
Montane white-toothed shrew	C. montis Thomas, 1906	Eastern Africa	Size: 4–18 cm (2–7 in) long, plus 4–11 cm (2–4 in) tail Habitat: Forest, shrubland, and grassland Diet: Invertebrates, small mammals, frogs, toads, and lizards	LC Unknown
Moonshine shrew	C. luna Dollman, 1910	Southeastern Africa	Size: 6–11 cm (2–4 in) long, plus 3–7 cm (1–3 in) tail Habitat: Forest Diet: Invertebrates, small mammals, frogs, toads, and lizards	LC Unknown
Mossy forest shrew	C. musseri Ruedi & Vogel, 1995	Sulawesi island in Indonesia	Size: 4–18 cm (2–7 in) long, plus 4–11 cm (2–4 in) tail Habitat: Forest Diet: Invertebrates, small mammals, frogs, toads, and lizards	VU Unknown
Mount Nimba giant forest shrew	C. nimbasilvanus Hutterer, 2003	Western Africa	Size: 4–18 cm (2–7 in) long, plus 4–11 cm (2–4 in) tail Habitat: Forest Diet: Invertebrates, small mammals, frogs, toads, and lizards	LC Unknown
Munissi's shrew	C. munissii Stanley, Hutterer, Giarla, & Esselstyn, 2015	Tanzania	Size: 4–18 cm (2–7 in) long, plus 4–11 cm (2–4 in) tail Habitat: Forest Diet: Invertebrates, small mammals, frogs, toads, and lizards	LC Unknown
Narrow-headed shrew	C. stenocephala Heim de Balsac & Dieterlen, 1979	Central Africa	Size: 8–11 cm (3–4 in) long, plus 6–9 cm (2–4 in) tail Habitat: Inland wetlands Diet: Invertebrates, small mammals, frogs, toads, and lizards	VU Unknown
Negev shrew	C. ramona Ivanitskaya, Shenbrot, & Nevo, 1996	Israel	Size: 4–18 cm (2–7 in) long, plus 4–11 cm (2–4 in) tail Habitat: Desert Diet: Invertebrates, small mammals, frogs, toads, and lizards	LC Unknown
Negros shrew	C. negrina Rabor, 1952	Philippines	Size: 4–18 cm (2–7 in) long, plus 4–11 cm (2–4 in) tail Habitat: Forest Diet: Invertebrates, small mammals, frogs, toads, and lizards	EN Unknown
Nicobar shrew	C. nicobarica Miller, 1902	Great Nicobar Island in India	Size: 4–18 cm (2–7 in) long, plus 4–11 cm (2–4 in) tail Habitat: Forest Diet: Invertebrates, small mammals, frogs, toads, and lizards	CR Unknown
Nigerian shrew	C. nigeriae Dollman, 1915	West-central Africa	Size: 9–11 cm (4 in) long, plus 5–7 cm (2–3 in) tail Habitat: Forest Diet: Invertebrates, small mammals, frogs, toads, and lizards	LC Unknown
Nimba shrew	C. nimbae Heim de Balsac, 1956	Western Africa	Size: 4–18 cm (2–7 in) long, plus 4–11 cm (2–4 in) tail Habitat: Forest Diet: Invertebrates, small mammals, frogs, toads, and lizards	NT Unknown
Niobe's shrew	C. niobe Thomas, 1906	Central Africa	Size: 6–9 cm (2–4 in) long, plus 5–7 cm (2–3 in) tail Habitat: Forest and grassland Diet: Invertebrates, small mammals, frogs, toads, and lizards	LC Unknown
North African white-toothed shrew	C. pachyura Küster, 1835	Northern Africa and southern Europe	Size: 4–18 cm (2–7 in) long, plus 4–11 cm (2–4 in) tail Habitat: Shrubland Diet: Invertebrates, small mammals, frogs, toads, and lizards	LC Unknown
North peninsula white-toothed shrew	C. pseudorhoditis Esselstyn, Achmadi, Handika, Swanson, Giarla, & Rowe, 2021	Sulawesi island in Indonesia	Size: 7–10 cm (3–4 in) long, plus 5–9 cm (2–4 in) tail Habitat: Forest Diet: Invertebrates, small mammals, frogs, toads, and lizards	LC Unknown
Nyiro shrew	C. macowi Dollman, 1915	Kenya	Size: 6–8 cm (2–3 in) long, plus 5–6 cm (2–2 in) tail Habitat: Unknown Diet: Invertebrates, small mammals, frogs, toads, and lizards	EN Unknown
Oriental shrew	C. orientalis Jentink, 1890 Two subspecies: C. o. lawuana; C. o. orientalis	Indonesia	Size: 4–18 cm (2–7 in) long, plus 4–11 cm (2–4 in) tail Habitat: Forest Diet: Invertebrates, small mammals, frogs, toads, and lizards	LC Unknown
Palawan shrew	C. palawanensis Taylor, 1934	Philippines	Size: 4–18 cm (2–7 in) long, plus 4–11 cm (2–4 in) tail Habitat: Forest and shrubland Diet: Invertebrates, small mammals, frogs, toads, and lizards	LC Unknown
Pale gray shrew	C. pergrisea Miller, 1913	Pakistan	Size: 4–18 cm (2–7 in) long, plus 4–11 cm (2–4 in) tail Habitat: Forest Diet: Invertebrates, small mammals, frogs, toads, and lizards	DD Unknown
Pallid-footed white-toothed shrew	C. pallida Esselstyn, Achmadi, Handika, Swanson, Giarla, & Rowe, 2021	Sulawesi island in Indonesia	Size: 7–9 cm (3–4 in) long, plus 4–8 cm (2–3 in) tail Habitat: Forest Diet: Invertebrates, small mammals, frogs, toads, and lizards	LC Unknown
Panay shrew	C. panayensis Hutterer, 2007	Philippines	Size: 4–18 cm (2–7 in) long, plus 4–11 cm (2–4 in) tail Habitat: Forest Diet: Invertebrates, small mammals, frogs, toads, and lizards	DD Unknown
Peninsular shrew	C. negligens Kloss, 1914	Southeastern Asia	Size: 4–18 cm (2–7 in) long, plus 4–11 cm (2–4 in) tail Habitat: Forest Diet: Invertebrates, small mammals, frogs, toads, and lizards	LC Unknown
Peters's musk shrew	C. gracilipes Peters, 1870	Tanzania	Size: About 6 cm (2 in) long, plus 5 cm (2 in) tail Habitat: Unknown Diet: Invertebrates, small mammals, frogs, toads, and lizards	DD Unknown
Phan Luong's shrew	C. phanluongi Jenkins, Abramov, Rozhnov, & Olsson, 2010	Vietnam and Cambodia	Size: 4–18 cm (2–7 in) long, plus 4–11 cm (2–4 in) tail Habitat: Forest Diet: Invertebrates, small mammals, frogs, toads, and lizards	LC Unknown
Phu Hoc shrew	C. phuquocensis Abramov, Jenkins, Rozhnov, & Kalinin, 2008	Phú Quốc island in Vietnam	Size: 4–18 cm (2–7 in) long, plus 4–11 cm (2–4 in) tail Habitat: Forest Diet: Invertebrates, small mammals, frogs, toads, and lizards	VU Unknown
Pitman's shrew	C. pitmani Barclay, 1932	Zambia	Size: About 5 cm (2 in) long, plus 4 cm (2 in) tail Habitat: Unknown Diet: Invertebrates, small mammals, frogs, toads, and lizards	DD Unknown
Polia's shrew	C. polia Hollister, 1916	Democratic Republic of the Congo	Size: About 6 cm (2 in) long, plus 7 cm (3 in) tail Habitat: Unknown Diet: Invertebrates, small mammals, frogs, toads, and lizards	DD Unknown
Rainey's shrew	C. raineyi Heller, 1912	Kenya	Size: 9–10 cm (4 in) long, plus 5–7 cm (2–3 in) tail Habitat: Forest Diet: Invertebrates, small mammals, frogs, toads, and lizards	EN Unknown
Reddish-gray musk shrew	C. cyanea (Duvernoy, 1838)	Southern Africa	Size: 6–10 cm (2–4 in) long, plus 3–7 cm (1–3 in) tail Habitat: Forest, grassland, and caves Diet: Invertebrates	LC Unknown
Roosevelt's shrew	C. roosevelti (Heller, 1910)	Central Africa	Size: 4–18 cm (2–7 in) long, plus 4–11 cm (2–4 in) tail Habitat: Savanna Diet: Invertebrates, small mammals, frogs, toads, and lizards	LC Unknown
Ryukyu shrew	C. orii Kuroda, 1924	Southern Japan	Size: 4–18 cm (2–7 in) long, plus 4–11 cm (2–4 in) tail Habitat: Forest Diet: Invertebrates, small mammals, frogs, toads, and lizards	EN Unknown
Sa Pa shrew	C. sapaensis Jenkins, Abramov, Bannikova, & Rozhnov, 2013	Vietnam	Size: 4–18 cm (2–7 in) long, plus 4–11 cm (2–4 in) tail Habitat: Forest and grassland Diet: Invertebrates, small mammals, frogs, toads, and lizards	DD Unknown
Saharan shrew	C. tarfayensis Vesmanis & Vesmanis, 1980	Mauritania and Morocco	Size: 4–18 cm (2–7 in) long, plus 4–11 cm (2–4 in) tail Habitat: Rocky areas and desert Diet: Invertebrates, small mammals, frogs, toads, and lizards	DD Unknown
Sahelian tiny shrew	C. pasha Dollman, 1915	Scattered northern Africa	Size: 4–6 cm (2 in) long, plus 2–4 cm (1–2 in) tail Habitat: Savanna Diet: Invertebrates, small mammals, frogs, toads, and lizards	LC Unknown
Savanna dwarf shrew	C. nanilla Thomas, 1909	Western and eastern Africa	Size: 4–6 cm (2–2 in) long, plus 3–5 cm (1–2 in) tail Habitat: Savanna Diet: Invertebrates, small mammals, frogs, toads, and lizards	LC Unknown
Savanna path shrew	C. viaria (Geoffroy, 1834)	Western, central, and eastern Africa	Size: 4–18 cm (2–7 in) long, plus 4–11 cm (2–4 in) tail Habitat: Forest and savanna Diet: Invertebrates, small mammals, frogs, toads, and lizards	LC Unknown
Savanna shrew	C. fulvastra (Sundevall, 1843)	Central Africa	Size: 4–18 cm (2–7 in) long, plus 4–11 cm (2–4 in) tail Habitat: Savanna Diet: Invertebrates, small mammals, frogs, toads, and lizards	LC Unknown
Savanna swamp shrew	C. longipes Hutterer & Happold, 1983	West-central Africa	Size: 9–12 cm (4–5 in) long, plus 5–7 cm (2–3 in) tail Habitat: Inland wetlands Diet: Invertebrates, small mammals, frogs, toads, and lizards	DD Unknown
Short-tailed white-toothed shrew	C. brevicauda Esselstyn, Achmadi, Handika, Swanson, Giarla, & Rowe, 2021	Sulawesi island in Indonesia	Size: 7–9 cm (3–4 in) long, plus 5–7 cm (2–3 in) tail Habitat: Forest Diet: Invertebrates, small mammals, frogs, toads, and lizards	VU Unknown
Siberian shrew	C. sibirica Dukelsky, 1930	Central Asia	Size: 4–18 cm (2–7 in) long, plus 4–11 cm (2–4 in) tail Habitat: Forest, grassland, inland wetlands, and desert Diet: Invertebrates, small mammals, frogs, toads, and lizards	LC Unknown
Sibuyan shrew	C. ninoyi Esselstyn & Goodman, 2010	Philippines	Size: 4–18 cm (2–7 in) long, plus 4–11 cm (2–4 in) tail Habitat: Forest Diet: Invertebrates, small mammals, frogs, toads, and lizards	DD Unknown
Sicilian shrew	C. sicula Miller, 1900 Four subspecies: C. s. aegatensis; C. s. calypso; C. s. esuae; C. s. sicula	Italy and Malta	Size: 4–18 cm (2–7 in) long, plus 4–11 cm (2–4 in) tail Habitat: Shrubland Diet: Invertebrates, small mammals, frogs, toads, and lizards	LC Unknown
Sinharaja white-toothed shrew	C. hikmiya Meegaskumbura, Meegaskumbura, Pethiyagoda, Manamendra-Arachchi, & Schneider, 2007	Sri Lanka	Size: 4–18 cm (2–7 in) long, plus 4–11 cm (2–4 in) tail Habitat: Forest Diet: Invertebrates, small mammals, frogs, toads, and lizards	EN Unknown
Small-footed shrew	C. parvipes Osgood, 1910	Central Africa	Size: 6–9 cm (2–4 in) long, plus 3–6 cm (1–2 in) tail Habitat: Forest, savanna, and shrubland Diet: Invertebrates, small mammals, frogs, toads, and lizards	LC Unknown
Smoky white-toothed shrew	C. fumosa Thomas, 1904	Kenya	Size: 4–18 cm (2–7 in) long, plus 4–11 cm (2–4 in) tail Habitat: Forest Diet: Invertebrates, small mammals, frogs, toads, and lizards	LC Unknown
Sokolov's shrew	C. sokolovi Jenkins, Abramov, Rozhnov, & Makarova, 2007	Vietnam	Size: 4–18 cm (2–7 in) long, plus 4–11 cm (2–4 in) tail Habitat: Forest Diet: Invertebrates, small mammals, frogs, toads, and lizards	NT Unknown
Somali dwarf shrew	C. nana Dobson, 1890	Ethiopia and Somalia	Size: About 4 cm (2 in) long, plus 3 cm (1 in) tail Habitat: Grassland Diet: Invertebrates, small mammals, frogs, toads, and lizards	DD Unknown
Somali shrew	C. somalica Thomas, 1895	Eastern Africa	Size: 6–8 cm (2–3 in) long, plus 4–5 cm (2–2 in) tail Habitat: Savanna Diet: Invertebrates, small mammals, frogs, toads, and lizards	LC Unknown
Southeast Asian shrew	C. fuliginosa (Blyth, 1856)	Southeastern Asian	Size: 4–18 cm (2–7 in) long, plus 4–11 cm (2–4 in) tail Habitat: Forest, shrubland, grassland, and rocky areas Diet: Invertebrates, small mammals, frogs, toads, and lizards	LC Unknown
Southern elongated white-toothed shrew	C. quasielongata Esselstyn, Achmadi, Handika, Swanson, Giarla, & Rowe, 2021	Sulawesi island in Indonesia	Size: 8–10 cm (3–4 in) long, plus 8–15 cm (3–6 in) tail Habitat: Forest Diet: Invertebrates, small mammals, frogs, toads, and lizards	LC Unknown
Southwest peninsula white-toothed shrew	C. australis Esselstyn, Achmadi, Handika, Swanson, Giarla, & Rowe, 2021	Sulawesi island in Indonesia	Size: 7–9 cm (3–4 in) long, plus 5–7 cm (2–3 in) tail Habitat: Forest Diet: Invertebrates, small mammals, frogs, toads, and lizards	EN Unknown
Sri Lankan long-tailed shrew	C. miya Phillips, 1929	Sri Lanka	Size: 4–18 cm (2–7 in) long, plus 4–11 cm (2–4 in) tail Habitat: Forest Diet: Invertebrates, small mammals, frogs, toads, and lizards	EN Unknown
Sulawesi shrew	C. lea Miller & Hollister, 1921	Sulawesi island in Indonesia	Size: 4–18 cm (2–7 in) long, plus 4–11 cm (2–4 in) tail Habitat: Forest Diet: Invertebrates, small mammals, frogs, toads, and lizards	LC Unknown
Sulawesi tiny shrew	C. levicula Miller & Hollister, 1921	Sulawesi island in Indonesia	Size: 4–18 cm (2–7 in) long, plus 4–11 cm (2–4 in) tail Habitat: Forest Diet: Invertebrates, small mammals, frogs, toads, and lizards	LC Unknown
Sulawesi white-handed shrew	C. rhoditis Miller & Hollister, 1921	Sulawesi island in Indonesia	Size: 4–18 cm (2–7 in) long, plus 4–11 cm (2–4 in) tail Habitat: Forest Diet: Invertebrates, small mammals, frogs, toads, and lizards	VU Unknown
Sumatran giant shrew	C. lepidura Lyon, 1908	Sumatra island in Indonesia	Size: 4–18 cm (2–7 in) long, plus 4–11 cm (2–4 in) tail Habitat: Forest and shrubland Diet: Invertebrates, small mammals, frogs, toads, and lizards	LC Unknown
Sumatran long-tailed shrew	C. paradoxura Dobson, 1886	Sumatra island in Indonesia	Size: 4–18 cm (2–7 in) long, plus 4–11 cm (2–4 in) tail Habitat: Forest Diet: Invertebrates, small mammals, frogs, toads, and lizards	LC Unknown
Sunda shrew	C. monticola Peters, 1870	Southeastern Asia	Size: 4–18 cm (2–7 in) long, plus 4–11 cm (2–4 in) tail Habitat: Forest Diet: Invertebrates, small mammals, frogs, toads, and lizards	LC Unknown
Swamp musk shrew	C. mariquensis (Smith, 1844) Three subspecies: C. m. mariquensis; C. m. neavei; C. m. shortridgei	Southern Africa	Size: 4–18 cm (2–7 in) long, plus 4–11 cm (2–4 in) tail Habitat: Inland wetlands Diet: Invertebrates, small mammals, frogs, toads, and lizards	LC Unknown
São Tomé shrew	C. thomensis (Bocage, 1887)	São Tomé Island in São Tomé and Príncipe	Size: 4–18 cm (2–7 in) long, plus 4–11 cm (2–4 in) tail Habitat: Forest Diet: Invertebrates, small mammals, frogs, toads, and lizards	EN Unknown
Taiwanese gray shrew	C. tanakae Kuroda, 1938	Eastern Asia	Size: 4–18 cm (2–7 in) long, plus 4–11 cm (2–4 in) tail Habitat: Forest and grassland Diet: Invertebrates, small mammals, frogs, toads, and lizards	LC Unknown
Tanzanian shrew	C. tansaniana Hutterer, 1986	Tanzania	Size: 8–11 cm (3–4 in) long, plus 5–8 cm (2–3 in) tail Habitat: Forest Diet: Invertebrates, small mammals, frogs, toads, and lizards	NT Unknown
Tarella shrew	C. tarella Dollman, 1915	Central Africa	Size: 4–18 cm (2–7 in) long, plus 4–11 cm (2–4 in) tail Habitat: Forest Diet: Invertebrates, small mammals, frogs, toads, and lizards	EN Unknown
Telford's shrew	C. telfordi Hutterer, 1986	Tanzania	Size: 10–11 cm (4 in) long, plus 7–9 cm (3–4 in) tail Habitat: Forest Diet: Invertebrates, small mammals, frogs, toads, and lizards	VU Unknown
Thalia's shrew	C. thalia Dippenaar, 1980	Ethiopia	Size: 7–10 cm (3–4 in) long, plus 5–7 cm (2–3 in) tail Habitat: Forest, savanna, shrubland, grassland, and inland wetlands Diet: Invertebrates, small mammals, frogs, toads, and lizards	LC Unknown
Therese's shrew	C. theresae Heim de Balsac, 1968	Western Africa	Size: 7–11 cm (3–4 in) long, plus 3–6 cm (1–2 in) tail Habitat: Forest and savanna Diet: Invertebrates, small mammals, frogs, toads, and lizards	LC Unknown
Thick-tailed shrew	C. brunnea Jentink, 1888 Two subspecies: C. b. brunnea; C. b. pudjonica	Indonesia	Size: 4–18 cm (2–7 in) long, plus 4–11 cm (2–4 in) tail Habitat: Forest Diet: Invertebrates, small mammals, frogs, toads, and lizards	LC Unknown
Timor shrew	C. tenuis (Müller, 1840)	Timor	Size: 4–18 cm (2–7 in) long, plus 4–11 cm (2–4 in) tail Habitat: Forest Diet: Invertebrates, small mammals, frogs, toads, and lizards	DD Unknown
Tiny Sulawesi white-toothed shrew	C. parva Esselstyn, Achmadi, Handika, Swanson, Giarla, & Rowe, 2021	Sulawesi island in Indonesia	Size: 5–7 cm (2–3 in) long, plus 2–5 cm (1–2 in) tail Habitat: Forest Diet: Invertebrates, small mammals, frogs, toads, and lizards	EN Unknown
Turbo shrew	C. turba Dollman, 1910	Central Africa	Size: 9–11 cm (4 in) long, plus 5–6 cm (2–2 in) tail Habitat: Forest Diet: Invertebrates, small mammals, frogs, toads, and lizards	LC Unknown
Typical Sulawesi white-toothed shrew	C. normalis Esselstyn, Achmadi, Handika, Swanson, Giarla, & Rowe, 2021	Sulawesi island in Indonesia	Size: 6–8 cm (2–3 in) long, plus 5–7 cm (2–3 in) tail Habitat: Forest Diet: Invertebrates, small mammals, frogs, toads, and lizards	LC Unknown
Ugandan lowland shrew	C. selina (Dollman, 1915)	Kenya and Uganda	Size: 7–9 cm (3–4 in) long, plus 5–7 cm (2–3 in) tail Habitat: Forest and inland wetlands Diet: Invertebrates, small mammals, frogs, toads, and lizards	DD Unknown
Ugandan musk shrew	C. mutesae Heller, 1910	Central Africa	Size: About 11 cm (4 in) long, plus 6 cm (2 in) tail Habitat: Forest Diet: Invertebrates, small mammals, frogs, toads, and lizards	DD Unknown
Ultimate shrew	C. ultima Dollman, 1915	Kenya	Size: About 9 cm (4 in) long, plus 6 cm (2 in) tail Habitat: Forest Diet: Invertebrates, small mammals, frogs, toads, and lizards	DD Unknown
Upemba shrew	C. zimmeri Osgood, 1936	Democratic Republic of the Congo	Size: 11–13 cm (4–5 in) long, plus 4–6 cm (2–2 in) tail Habitat: Unknown Diet: Invertebrates, small mammals, frogs, toads, and lizards	DD Unknown
Usambara shrew	C. usambarae Dippenaar, 1980	Tanzania	Size: 7–9 cm (3–4 in) long, plus 5–7 cm (2–3 in) tail Habitat: Forest Diet: Invertebrates, small mammals, frogs, toads, and lizards	VU Unknown
Ussuri white-toothed shrew	C. lasiura (Dobson, 1890)	Eastern Asia	Size: 4–18 cm (2–7 in) long, plus 4–11 cm (2–4 in) tail Habitat: Grassland Diet: Insects and other invertebrates, as well as small vertebrates	LC Unknown
Voi shrew	C. voi Osgood, 1910	Central and eastern Africa	Size: 4–18 cm (2–7 in) long, plus 4–11 cm (2–4 in) tail Habitat: Savanna Diet: Invertebrates, small mammals, frogs, toads, and lizards	LC Unknown
Voracious shrew	C. vorax Allen, 1923	Southeastern Asia	Size: 4–18 cm (2–7 in) long, plus 4–11 cm (2–4 in) tail Habitat: Forest Diet: Invertebrates, small mammals, frogs, toads, and lizards	LC Unknown
West African long-tailed shrew	C. muricauda (Miller, 1900)	Western Africa	Size: 5–7 cm (2–3 in) long, plus tail Habitat: Forest Diet: Invertebrates, small mammals, frogs, toads, and lizards	LC Unknown
West African pygmy shrew	C. obscurior Heim de Balsac, 1958	Western Africa	Size: 4–5 cm (2–2 in) long, plus 3–4 cm (1–2 in) tail Habitat: Forest Diet: Invertebrates, small mammals, frogs, toads, and lizards	LC Unknown
West Sulawesi white-toothed shrew	C. ordinaria Esselstyn, Achmadi, Handika, Swanson, Giarla, & Rowe, 2021	Sulawesi island in Indonesia	Size: 7–9 cm (3–4 in) long, plus 5–8 cm (2–3 in) tail Habitat: Forest Diet: Invertebrates, small mammals, frogs, toads, and lizards	NT Unknown
West-central Sulawesi white-toothed shrew 180px|alt=	C. solita Esselstyn, Achmadi, Handika, Swanson, Giarla, & Rowe, 2021	Sulawesi island in Indonesia	Size: 6–8 cm (2–3 in) long, plus 5–8 cm (2–3 in) tail Habitat: Forest Diet: Invertebrates, small mammals, frogs, toads, and lizards	NT Unknown
Whitaker's shrew	C. whitakeri De Winton, 1898	Northwestern Africa	Size: 5–7 cm (2–3 in) long, plus 2–4 cm (1–2 in) tail Habitat: Coastal marine, intertidal marine, and shrubland Diet: Invertebrates, small mammals, frogs, toads, and lizards	LC Unknown
Wimmer's shrew	C. wimmeri Heim de Balsac & Aellen, 1958	Ivory Coast	Size: 8–9 cm (3–4 in) long, plus 5–6 cm (2–2 in) tail Habitat: Forest Diet: Invertebrates, small mammals, frogs, toads, and lizards	VU Unknown
Xanthippe's shrew	C. xantippe Osgood, 1910	Kenya and Tanzania	Size: 8–10 cm (3–4 in) long, plus 5–7 cm (2–3 in) tail Habitat: Savanna and shrubland Diet: Invertebrates, small mammals, frogs, toads, and lizards	LC Unknown
Yankari shrew	C. yankariensis Hutterer & Jenkins, 1980	Central and eastern Africa	Size: 5–7 cm (2–3 in) long, plus 3–5 cm (1–2 in) tail Habitat: Savanna Diet: Invertebrates, small mammals, frogs, toads, and lizards	LC Unknown
Zaphir's shrew	C. zaphiri Dollman, 1915	Ethiopia and Kenya	Size: About 10 cm (4 in) long, plus 6 cm (2 in) tail Habitat: Unknown Diet: Invertebrates, small mammals, frogs, toads, and lizards	DD Unknown
Zarudny's rock shrew	C. zarudnyi Ognew, 1928	Central Asia	Size: 4–18 cm (2–7 in) long, plus 4–11 cm (2–4 in) tail Habitat: Desert Diet: Invertebrates, small mammals, frogs, toads, and lizards	LC Unknown

Genus Diplomesodon – Brandt, 1852 – one species
Common name	Scientific name and subspecies	Range	Size and ecology	IUCN status and estimated population
Piebald shrew	D. pulchellum (Lichtenstein, 1823)	Central Asia	Size: 5–8 cm (2–3 in) long, plus 2–4 cm (1–2 in) tail Habitat: Desert Diet: Insects, as well as small lizards	LC Unknown

Genus Feroculus – Kelaart, 1852 – one species
Common name	Scientific name and subspecies	Range	Size and ecology	IUCN status and estimated population
Kelaart's long-clawed shrew	F. feroculus (Kelaart, 1850)	Southern India and Sri Lanka	Size: 10–12 cm (4–5 in) long, plus 5–8 cm (2–3 in) tail Habitat: Forest, grassland, and inland wetlands Diet: Earthworms, small vertebrates, and plants	EN Unknown

Genus Paracrocidura – Heim de Balsac, 1956 – three species
Common name	Scientific name and subspecies	Range	Size and ecology	IUCN status and estimated population
Grauer's large-headed shrew	P. graueri Hutterer, 1986	Democratic Republic of the Congo	Size: 6–10 cm (2–4 in) long, plus 3–5 cm (1–2 in) tail Habitat: Forest Diet: Insects	DD Unknown
Greater large-headed shrew	P. maxima Heim de Balsac, 1959	Central Africa	Size: 6–10 cm (2–4 in) long, plus 3–5 cm (1–2 in) tail Habitat: Forest and inland wetlands Diet: Insects	LC Unknown
Lesser large-headed shrew	P. schoutedeni Heim de Balsac, 1956	West-central Africa	Size: 6–10 cm (2–4 in) long, plus 3–5 cm (1–2 in) tail Habitat: Forest Diet: Insects	LC Unknown

Genus Ruwenzorisorex – Hutterer, 1986 – one species
Common name	Scientific name and subspecies	Range	Size and ecology	IUCN status and estimated population
Ruwenzori shrew	R. suncoides (Osgood, 1936)	Central Africa	Size: 9–10 cm (4 in) long, plus 5–7 cm (2–3 in) tail Habitat: Inland wetlands and forest Diet: Mollusks and small vertebrates	VU Unknown

Genus Scutisorex – Thomas, 1910 – two species
Common name	Scientific name and subspecies	Range	Size and ecology	IUCN status and estimated population
Hero shrew	S. somereni (Thomas, 1910)	Central Africa	Size: 12–15 cm (5–6 in) long, plus 6–10 cm (2–4 in) tail Habitat: Forest Diet: Insects, earthworms, and small vertebrates	LC Unknown
Thor's hero shrew	S. thori Stanley, Malekani, &Gambalemoke, 2013	Democratic Republic of the Congo	Size: 12–15 cm (5–6 in) long, plus 6–10 cm (2–4 in) tail Habitat: Forest Diet: Small animals and plants	DD Unknown

Genus Solisorex – Thomas, 1924 – one species
Common name	Scientific name and subspecies	Range	Size and ecology	IUCN status and estimated population
Pearson's long-clawed shrew	S. pearsoni Thomas, 1924	Sri Lanka	Size: 12–15 cm (5–6 in) long, plus 5–7 cm (2–3 in) tail Habitat: Forest and grassland Diet: Insects, earthworms, and small vertebrates	EN Unknown

Genus Suncus – Ehrenberg, 1832 – eighteen species
Common name	Scientific name and subspecies	Range	Size and ecology	IUCN status and estimated population
Anderson's shrew	S. stoliczkanus (Anderson, 1877)	Southern Asia	Size: 5–9 cm (2–4 in) long, plus 3–10 cm (1–4 in) tail Habitat: Forest and grassland Diet: Insects	LC Unknown
Asian highland shrew	S. montanus (Kelaart, 1850)	Southern India and Sri Lanka	Size: 5–9 cm (2–4 in) long, plus 3–10 cm (1–4 in) tail Habitat: Forest and grassland Diet: Insects	LC Unknown
Asian house shrew	S. murinus (Linnaeus, 1766)	Asia and Africa (introduced in red)	Size: 10–5 cm (4–2 in) long, plus 5–9 cm (2–4 in) tail Habitat: Forest, savanna, shrubland, grassland, and inland wetlands Diet: Insects and small mammals, as well as plants	LC Unknown
Black shrew	S. ater (Medway, 1965)	Northern Borneo	Size: 5–9 cm (2–4 in) long, plus 3–10 cm (1–4 in) tail Habitat: Forest Diet: Insects	DD Unknown
Bornean pygmy shrew	S. hosei (Thomas, 1893)	Borneo	Size: 5–9 cm (2–4 in) long, plus 3–10 cm (1–4 in) tail Habitat: Forest Diet: Insects	DD Unknown
Climbing shrew	S. megalura (Jentink, 1888)	Sub-Saharan Africa	Size: 5–6 cm (2 in) long, plus 8–10 cm (3–4 in) tail Habitat: Forest and savanna Diet: Insects	LC Unknown
Day's shrew	S. dayi (Dodson, 1888)	Southern India	Size: 5–9 cm (2–4 in) long, plus 3–10 cm (1–4 in) tail Habitat: Forest and grassland Diet: Insects	EN Unknown
Etruscan shrew	S. etruscus (Savi, 1822)	Europe, northern Africa, and Asia	Size: 3–5 cm (1–2 in) long, plus 2–3 cm (1 in) tail Habitat: Forest, shrubland, grassland, and desert Diet: Insects	LC Unknown
Flores shrew	S. mertensi Kock, 1974	Flores island in Indonesia	Size: 5–9 cm (2–4 in) long, plus 3–10 cm (1–4 in) tail Habitat: Forest Diet: Insects	EN Unknown
Greater dwarf shrew	S. lixus (Thomas, 1898)	Southern Africa	Size: 5–9 cm (2–4 in) long, plus 3–6 cm (1–2 in) tail Habitat: Forest, savanna, shrubland, and grassland Diet: Insects	LC Unknown
Hutu-Tutsi dwarf shrew	S. hututsi Peterhans & Hutterer, 2009	Central Africa	Size: 4–6 cm (2 in) long, plus 2–3 cm (1 in) tail Habitat: Forest and shrubland Diet: Insects	LC Unknown
Jungle shrew	S. zeylanicus Phillips, 1928	Sri Lanka	Size: 5–9 cm (2–4 in) long, plus 3–10 cm (1–4 in) tail Habitat: Forest Diet: Insects	EN Unknown
Least dwarf shrew	S. infinitesimus (Heller, 1912)	South Africa and Kenya	Size: 5–7 cm (2–3 in) long, plus 2–4 cm (1–2 in) tail Habitat: Forest and grassland Diet: Insects	LC Unknown
Lesser dwarf shrew	S. varilla (Thomas, 1895)	Southern Africa	Size: 5–7 cm (2–3 in) long, plus 2–5 cm (1–2 in) tail Habitat: Forest, savanna, shrubland, and grassland Diet: Insects	LC Unknown
Malayan pygmy shrew	S. malayanus (Kloss, 1917)	Malaysia and Thailand	Size: 5–9 cm (2–4 in) long, plus 3–10 cm (1–4 in) tail Habitat: Forest Diet: Insects	LC Unknown
Remy's pygmy shrew	S. remyi Brosset, Dubost, & Heim de Balsac, 1965	West-central Africa	Size: 4–5 cm (2 in) long, plus 1–3 cm (0.4–1.2 in) tail Habitat: Forest Diet: Insects	LC Unknown
Sri Lankan shrew	S. fellowesgordoni Phillips, 1932	Sri Lanka	Size: 5–9 cm (2–4 in) long, plus 3–10 cm (1–4 in) tail Habitat: Forest and grassland Diet: Insects	EN Unknown
Taita shrew	S. aequatorius (Heller, 1912)	Kenya	Size: 6–9 cm (2–4 in) long, plus 5–7 cm (2–3 in) tail Habitat: Forest Diet: Insects	EN Unknown

Genus Sylvisorex – Thomas, 1904 – fifteen species
Common name	Scientific name and subspecies	Range	Size and ecology	IUCN status and estimated population
Bamenda pygmy shrew	S. silvanorum (Hutterer, Riegert, & Sedláček, 2009)	Cameroon	Size: 4–10 cm (2–4 in) long, plus 4–9 cm (2–4 in) tail Habitat: Forest and grassland Diet: Insects	DD Unknown
Bioko forest shrew	S. isabellae Heim de Balsac, 1968	West-central Africa	Size: 4–10 cm (2–4 in) long, plus 4–9 cm (2–4 in) tail Habitat: Forest and grassland Diet: Insects	VU Unknown
Cameroonian forest shrew	S. camerunensis Heim de Balsac, 1968	West-central Africa	Size: 5–6 cm (2 in) long, plus 5–7 cm (2–3 in) tail Habitat: Forest and grassland Diet: Insects	VU Unknown
Corbet's forest shrew	S. corbeti Hutterer, 2009	West-central Africa	Size: 4–10 cm (2–4 in) long, plus 4–9 cm (2–4 in) tail Habitat: Forest Diet: Insects	DD Unknown
Dudu Akaibe's pygmy shrew	S. akaibei Mukinzi, Hutterer, & Barriere, 2009	Democratic Republic of the Congo	Size: 4–10 cm (2–4 in) long, plus 4–9 cm (2–4 in) tail Habitat: Forest Diet: Insects	LC Unknown
Grant's forest shrew	S. granti Thomas, 1907 Two subspecies: S. g. granti; S. g. mundus	Central Africa	Size: 4–7 cm (2–3 in) long, plus 4–7 cm (2–3 in) tail Habitat: Forest Diet: Insects	LC Unknown
Greater forest shrew	S. ollula Thomas, 1913	Central Africa	Size: 5–8 cm (2–3 in) long, plus 1–2 cm (0–1 in) tail Habitat: Forest Diet: Insects	LC Unknown
Howell's forest shrew	S. howelli Jenkins, 1984	Tanzania	Size: 5–8 cm (2–3 in) long, plus 3–5 cm (1–2 in) tail Habitat: Forest Diet: Insects	LC Unknown
Johnston's forest shrew	S. johnstoni (Dobson, 1888)	West-central and central Africa	Size: 7–10 cm (3–4 in) long, plus 4–7 cm (2–3 in) tail Habitat: Forest Diet: Insects	LC Unknown
Kongana shrew	S. konganensis Ray & Hutterer, 1996	Central Africa	Size: 4–10 cm (2–4 in) long, plus 4–9 cm (2–4 in) tail Habitat: Forest Diet: Insects	DD Unknown
Lesser forest shrew	S. oriundus Hollister, 1916	Central Africa	Size: 4–10 cm (2–4 in) long, plus 4–9 cm (2–4 in) tail Habitat: Forest Diet: Insects	DD Unknown
Moon forest shrew	S. lunaris Thomas, 1906	Central Africa	Size: 7–10 cm (3–4 in) long, plus 4–6 cm (2 in) tail Habitat: Forest Diet: Insects	NT Unknown
Mount Cameroon forest shrew	S. morio (Gray, 1862)	West-central Africa	Size: 6–8 cm (2–3 in) long, plus 5–6 cm (2 in) tail Habitat: Forest Diet: Insects	EN Unknown
Rain forest shrew	S. pluvialis Hutterer & Schlitter, 1996	West-central Africa	Size: 6–8 cm (2–3 in) long, plus 5–8 cm (2–3 in) tail Habitat: Forest Diet: Insects	DD Unknown
Volcano shrew	S. vulcanorum Hutterer & Verheyan, 1985	Central Africa	Size: 4–6 cm (2 in) long, plus 4–7 cm (2–3 in) tail Habitat: Forest and inland wetlands Diet: Insects	LC Unknown

== Sources ==
- Chernasky, Amy; Motis, Anna; Burgin, Connor, eds. (2023). All the Mammals of the World. Lynx Nature Books. ISBN 978-84-16728-66-4.
- Kingdon, Jonathan (2014). Mammals of Africa. Vol. IV: Hedgehogs, Shrews and Bats. A & C Black. ISBN 978-1-4081-8993-1.
- Nowak, Ronald M. (1999). Walker's Mammals of the World. Vol. 1. Johns Hopkins University Press. ISBN 978-0-8018-5789-8.
- Hutterer, Rainer (2005). Wilson, Don E.; Reeder, DeeAnn M. (eds.). Mammal Species of the World. Vol. 1 (3rd ed.). Johns Hopkins University Press. ISBN 978-0-8018-8221-0.
