= Mount Nimba giant forest shrew =

Conservation status
- Least Concern (IUCN 3.1)

Scientific classification
- Kingdom: Animalia
- Phylum: Chordata
- Class: Mammalia
- Order: Eulipotyphla
- Family: Soricidae
- Genus: Crocidura
- Species: C. nimbasilvanus

Binomial name
- Crocidura nimbasilvanus Hutterer, 2003

Synonyms
- Crocidura guineensis guineensis Heim de Balsac, 1968; Crocidura goliath nimbasilvanus Hutterer, 2003

Species of mammal

The Mount Nimba giant forest shrew (Crocidura nimbasilvanus) is a species of mammal in the family Soricidae. It is native to West Africa, where it is found in Ivory Coast, Guinea, Liberia, and Sierra Leone.

It was formerly synonymized with the goliath shrew (C. goliath), but phylogenetic studies have found it to be more closely related to the Nimba shrew (C. nimbae). It is found in the lowland forests of the Upper Guinean forests, with isolated populations in Mount Nimba, the Ziama Massif, the Simandou Range, and Gola Rainforest National Park. Although it is thought to be an uncommon species, it is not considered to be threatened due to a wide range and occurring in several protected areas, although at some localities it may be at risk from habitat destruction due to mining concessions.
