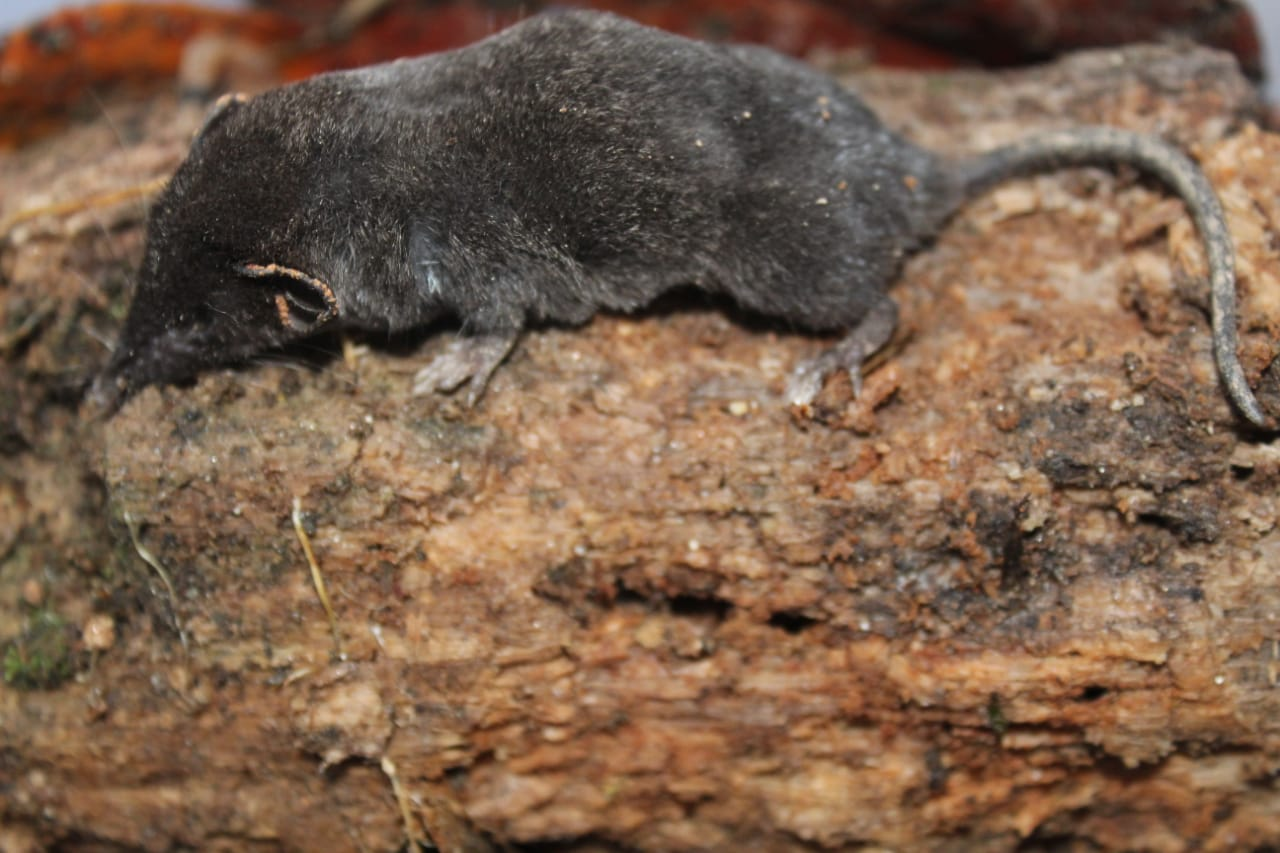

Conservation status
- Least Concern (IUCN 3.1)

Scientific classification
- Kingdom: Animalia
- Phylum: Chordata
- Class: Mammalia
- Order: Eulipotyphla
- Family: Soricidae
- Genus: Crocidura
- Species: C. nigripes

Binomial name
- Crocidura nigripes Miller & Hollister, 1921
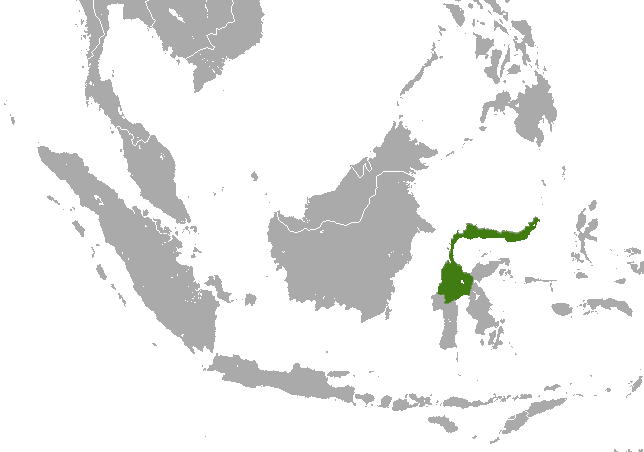
- Black-footed shrew range

= Black-footed shrew =

Species of mammal

The black-footed shrew (Crocidura nigripes) is a species of mammal in the family Soricidae. It is endemic to northern and central Sulawesi, Indonesia where it lives on the floor of the tropical forests. The International Union for Conservation of Nature has assessed its conservation status as being of "least concern".

== Taxonomy ==
The black-footed shrew was first described in 1921 by the American zoologists Gerrit Smith Miller Jr. and Hollister as Crocidura nigripes. The type locality is southwest of Lake Tondano, Temboan in North Sulawesi. Crocidura nigripes is part of an assemblage of shrews endemic to northern and central Sulawesi which also includes the Sulawesi white-handed shrew (Crocidura rhoditis), the Sulawesi shrew (Crocidura lea), the elongated shrew (Crocidura elongata) and the mossy forest shrew (Crocidura musseri).

Its evolutionary proximity to the Sabahan lineage of the Bornean shrew, C. foetida sensu lato and C. baluensis, might suggest a human-mediated introduction to Sulawesi.

== Description ==
The Sulawesi black-footed shrew is a small species of white-toothed shrew; it lacks the deposits of iron in the enamel of the teeth which is seen in the red-toothed shrews. The dorsal pelage is short and velvety, being greyish-brown or reddish-brown and the underside is paler. The ears are prominent, the legs are short, the feet are black, and the tail is long and clothed with a scattering of long hairs.

== Distribution and habitat ==
The Sulawesi black-footed shrew is endemic to the island of Sulawesi in Indonesia. It occurs in the central and northern part of the island at altitudes of up to about 3,000 m (10,000 ft) above sea level. Its habitat is the floor of both lowland and montane tropical forests where it forages among the leaf litter. It is thought to be nocturnal, but very little is known about its habits and life cycle.

== Status ==
The Sulawesi black-footed shrew has a wide range and is believed to be present in several protected areas. The population trend appears to be steady and no particular threats to this species have been recognised although it is likely to be adversely affected by forest clearance. It is not clear whether it can adapt to alternative habitats when woodland is felled. The International Union for Conservation of Nature has assessed its conservation status as being of "least concern".
