= Sulawesi white-handed shrew =

Conservation status
- Vulnerable (IUCN 3.1)

Scientific classification
- Kingdom: Animalia
- Phylum: Chordata
- Class: Mammalia
- Order: Eulipotyphla
- Family: Soricidae
- Genus: Crocidura
- Species: C. rhoditis

Binomial name
- Crocidura rhoditis Miller & Hollister, 1921
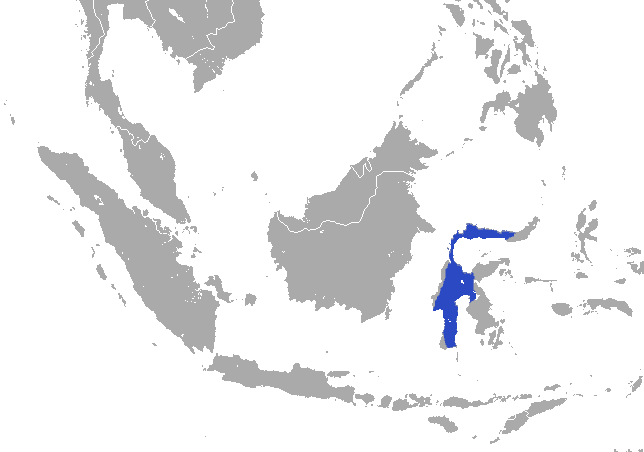
- Sulawesi White-handed shrew range

Species of mammal

The Sulawesi white-handed shrew or Temboan shrew (Crocidura rhoditis) is a species of mammal in the family Soricidae. It is endemic to the island of Sulawesi in Indonesia. It is a fairly common species and the population seems stable so the International Union for Conservation of Nature has assessed its conservation status as being a "vulnerable species".

== Taxonomy ==
The Sulawesi white-handed shrew was first described in 1921 by the American zoologists Gerrit Smith Miller Jr. and Hollister as Crocidura rhoditis. The type locality is Temboan in North Sulawesi. Crocidura rhoditis is part of an assemblage of shrews endemic to northern and central Sulawesi which also includes the Sulawesi shrew (Crocidura lea), the black-footed shrew (Crocidura nigripes), the elongated shrew (Crocidura elongata) and the mossy forest shrew (Crocidura musseri). Deep genetic divergences have been detected within Crocidura rhoditis, suggesting the existence of potential cryptic diversity in this species

== Description ==
The Sulawesi white-handed shrew is a small species of white-toothed shrew; it lacks the deposits of iron in the enamel of the teeth which is seen in the red-toothed shrews. The dorsal pelage is short and velvety, being greyish-brown or reddish-brown and the underside is paler. The ears are prominent, the legs are short, the feet are white, and the tail is long and clad with a few long well-scattered hairs.

== Distribution and habitat ==
The Sulawesi white-handed shrew is endemic to the Indonesian island of Sulawesi where it is found in the northern, central and southwestern parts of the island. Its typical habitat is primary tropical lowland or montane forests, but it seems able to survive in secondary forests as well. The extent to which it can adapt to degraded habitats is unclear.

== Behaviour ==
Very little is known of its natural history and behaviour of the Sulawesi white-handed shrew. Like other members of its family it lives among the leaf litter and is insectivorous and is likely to eat insects and small arthropods. They have a very short lifespan, with most individuals living for only 12-18 months.

== Status ==
The Sulawesi white-handed shrew is fairly common in some locations and is regularly caught in pitfall traps. The population trend appears to be steady and no particular threats to this species have been recognised although it is likely to be adversely affected by forest clearance. It has a wide range and is believed to be present in several protected areas, and the International Union for Conservation of Nature has assessed its conservation status as being of "Vulnerable".
