= Ugandan musk shrew =

Conservation status
- Data Deficient (IUCN 3.1)

Scientific classification
- Kingdom: Animalia
- Phylum: Chordata
- Class: Mammalia
- Order: Eulipotyphla
- Family: Soricidae
- Genus: Crocidura
- Species: C. mutesae

Binomial name
- Crocidura mutesae Heller, 1910
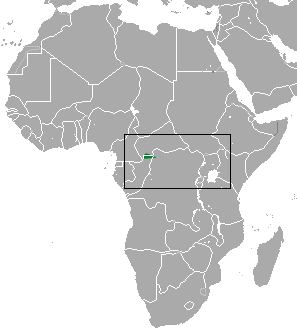
- Ugandan musk shrew range

Species of mammal

The Ugandan musk shrew (Crocidura mutesae) is a species of mammal in the family Soricidae. It is found in Uganda, the Democratic Republic of Congo and the Central African Republic. Its range, population size and habits are poorly known.

== Description ==
This is a large shrew growing to a head-and-body length of about 115 mm (4.5 in) with a tail of 64 mm (2.5 in). The pelage is long, both dorsal and ventral fur being greyish, while the legs are darker grey. The tail is thick and densely-haired, dark grey, with bristles 10 to 12 mm (0.4 to 0.5 in) long and a pilosity of 70 to 80%. The hind feet are both long and broad. This species resembles the African giant shrew (Crocidura olivieri), but is slightly smaller, with a smaller, less robust skull.

== Distribution and habitat ==
The Ugandan musk shrew has a disjoint distribution, having been found in Uganda, where the type locality is Kampala, in Tandala in the Democratic Republic of the Congo, and in the Dzanga-Sangha Special Reserve and Batouri in the Central African Republic. It is present in both primary and secondary forest, as well as in single species Gilbertiodendron dewevrei forest. This shrew seems to favour fairly open areas with little undergrowth.

== Status ==
This shrew is poorly known and its precise range, natural history and the threats it faces are unknown. In a mixed forest in Salo, in the Central African Republic, it formed about one third of all shrews caught in pitfall traps, and in the Dzanga-Sangha Special Reserve, it was identified in 2.3% of scats left by small carnivores. Because it has insufficient evidence of its abundance and population size, the International Union for Conservation of Nature has assessed its conservation status as being "data deficient".
