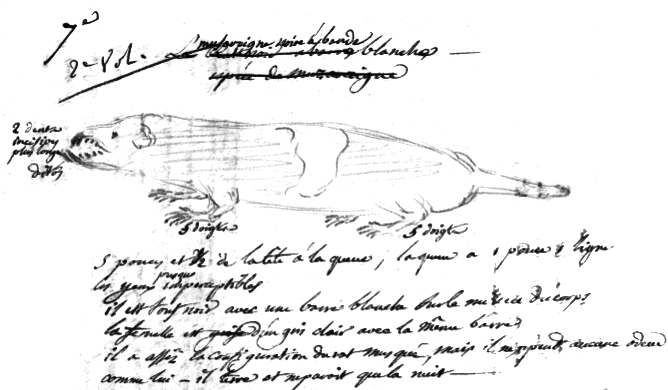
- Sonnerat's illustration from c. 1813, the iconotype

Conservation status
- Extinct

Scientific classification
- Kingdom: Animalia
- Phylum: Chordata
- Class: Mammalia
- Order: Eulipotyphla
- Family: Soricidae
- Genus: Diplomesodon
- Species: †D. sonnerati

Binomial name
- †Diplomesodon sonnerati Cheke, 2018

= Sonnerat's shrew =

Species of mammal

Sonnerat's shrew (Diplomesodon sonnerati or Crocidura sonnerati) is a species of shrew that was first described by Pierre Sonnerat from Pondicherry somewhere in 1813.

== Description ==
It was described as being larger than the commoner Suncus murinus and without a musky smell. Males were shiny black with a white band or patch on the middle of the back. Females also had the white patch but were grey. Sonnerat described the shrew as being five and a half inches [149 mm] from the head to the base of the tail and the tail being one inch and one line or 29 mm.

== Taxonomy ==
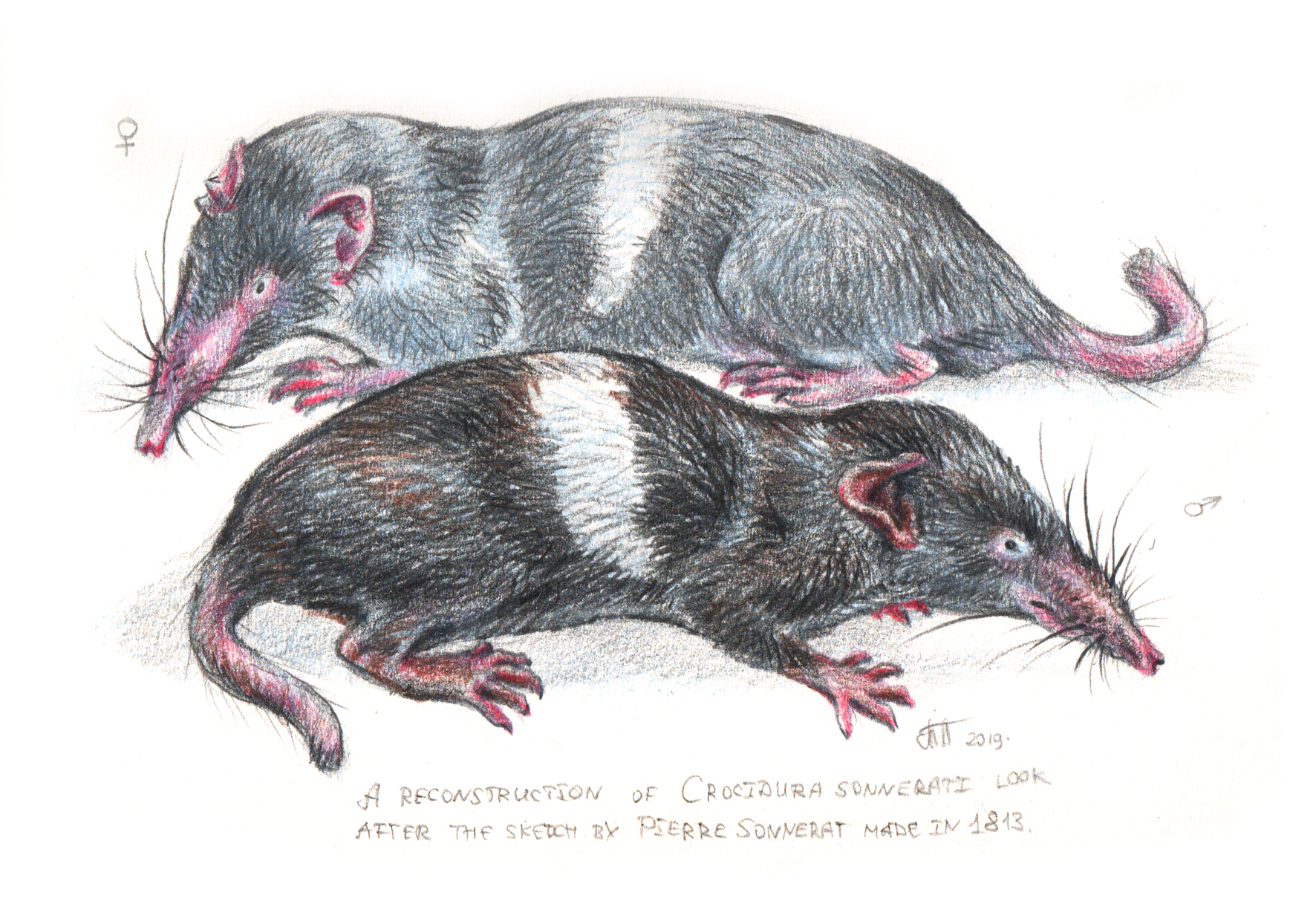
An artist's depiction

Since no specimen of the species exists, both its taxonomic description and its generic placement remain in question.

The supposed shrew species was given a scientific name by Anthony Cheke which was first published in 2012 but the description was not considered valid by some as the holotype was not explicitly designated (in this case the illustration, as there was no specimen) and it was therefore redescribed in 2018. The species was placed tentatively in the genus Diplomesodon which is nested within Crocidura according to a molecular phylogenetic study. Cheke placed the species tentatively in the genus based on the observation that the only other shrew species with a piebald pattern was in the central Asian species Diplomesodon pulchellum. Considering that no specimen matching the species has ever been found ever since, it is thought that the species has since gone extinct because it has not been seen alive since 1813.

In 2025, a paper described a specimen of a dead shrew photographed in the Nilgiris which may possibly represent this species. Unfortunately no material was collected, making any DNA-sequence based verification of its novelty impossible.
