= Peninsular shrew =

Conservation status
- Least Concern (IUCN 3.1)

Scientific classification
- Kingdom: Animalia
- Phylum: Chordata
- Class: Mammalia
- Order: Eulipotyphla
- Family: Soricidae
- Genus: Crocidura
- Species: C. negligens

Binomial name
- Crocidura negligens Robinson & Kloss, 1914
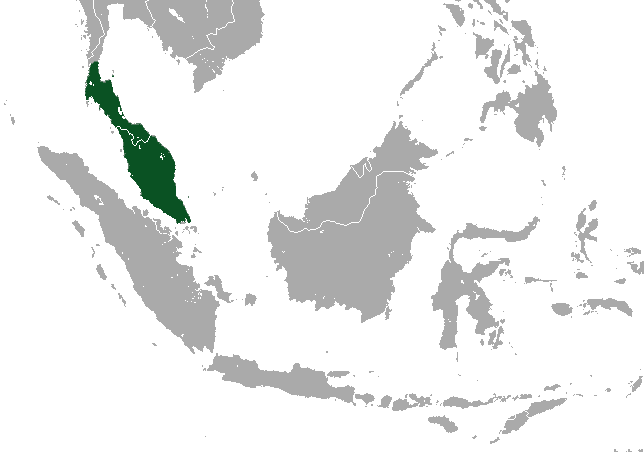

Species of mammal

The peninsular shrew (Crocidura negligens) is a species of mammal in the family Soricidae. It is found in the Malay Peninsula and Thailand (south of the Kra Isthmus). It is also found on the adjacent islands of Koh Samui, Pulau Tioman, and Pulau Mapor. This species has recently been synonymized with Crocidura malayana
