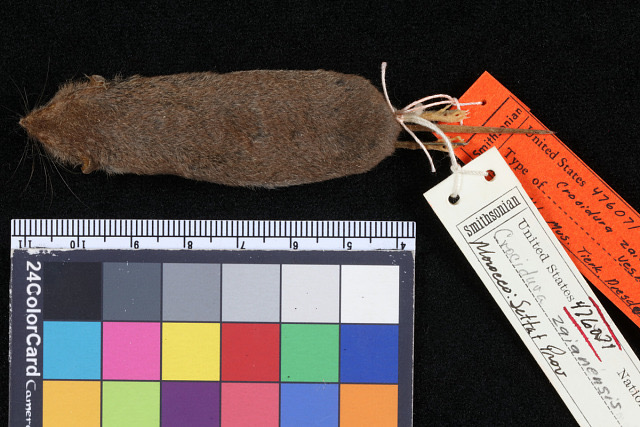
- specimen

Conservation status
- Least Concern (IUCN 3.1)

Scientific classification
- Kingdom: Animalia
- Phylum: Chordata
- Class: Mammalia
- Order: Eulipotyphla
- Family: Soricidae
- Genus: Crocidura
- Species: C. whitakeri

Binomial name
- Crocidura whitakeri de Winton, 1898
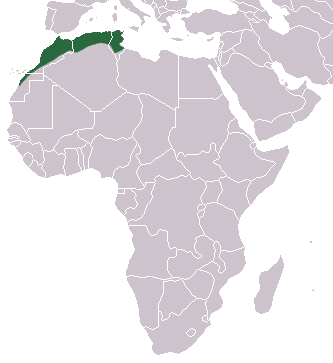
- Whitaker's Shrew range

= Whitaker's shrew =

Whitaker's Shrew

Species of mammal

Whitaker's shrew (Crocidura whitakeri) is a species of mammal in the family Soricidae. It is found in Western Sahara, Algeria, Morocco, Tunisia. Its natural habitats are subtropical or tropical dry shrubland, rocky and sandy coasts. It is a fairly common species and the International Union for Conservation of Nature has rated its conservation status as being of "least concern".

== Description ==
The Whitaker's shrew is a small, pale shrew, with a head-and-body length averaging 61 mm (2.4 in) and a tail averaging 33 mm (1.3 in). Its head and ears are larger than those of the greater white-toothed shrew (Crocidura russula). The fur is short and silky. The upper parts are buffy-brown speckled with white, the individual hairs having a grey shaft, a white band and brown tip. The underparts are whitish, the hairs being grey near the base and white near the tip. The feet are pale on both the upper and lower surfaces. The tail is pale above and white below.

== Distribution and habitat ==
Whitaker's shrew is native to Western Sahara, Morocco, Algeria and Tunisia. It is found from sea level to altitudes of 1,800 m (5,906 ft) in the Atlas Mountains. It occurs in a range of habitats including stony and bare steppe, semi-deserts, areas with sparse scrubby vegetation and sandy coastal dunes. It is common on the Atlantic slopes of Morocco but rare on the coastal slopes of Algeria.

== Ecology ==
Little is known of this shrew's habits, diet or reproduction. It is mainly nocturnal, taking shelter by day in rodent burrows and rock fissures. Its chief predator is the barn owl (Tyto alba), and its remains are often found in owl pellets. It is also preyed on by the pharaoh eagle-owl (Bubo ascalaphus), the tawny owl (Strix aluco) and the black-winged kite (Elanus caeruleus).
