= Joseph Pearson (zoologist) =

British zoologist (1881–1971)

Joseph Pearson FRSE FLS (19 April 1881 – 20 June 1971) was a British-born zoologist and marine biologist associated with Ceylon and Tasmania. Pearson's long-clawed shrew (Solisorex pearsoni) is named after him.

== Life ==
Pearson was born in Yorkshire on 19 April 1881, the son of Daniel Pearson and Cecilia Parr. He was educated at Liverpool College and later studied Natural History at Liverpool University graduating BSc in 1902, and then doing postgraduate studies at Manchester University.

In 1910 Pearson went to Ceylon (now known as Sri Lanka) as Marine Biologist to the Ceylon Government and as Director of the Colombo Museum. In 1914 he was elected a Fellow of the Royal Society of Edinburgh. His proposers were Sir William Abbott Herdman, James Hartley Ashworth, James Cossar Ewart, and William Spiers Bruce. In the First World War he served in France.

In 1933 Pearson moved to Tasmania as Director of the Tasmanian Museum and Art Gallery in Hobart. In the Second World War he was employed as a camouflage expert by the Australian government.

Pearson died in Tasmania on 20 June 1971.

== Family ==
Pearson married twice, first to Lillia McConnell (d.1941) then to Mavis Meadowcroft (d.1961).

== Publications ==
- Marine Biology in Ceylon (1928)
