= Pearson's long-clawed shrew =

Conservation status
- Endangered (IUCN 3.1)

Scientific classification
- Kingdom: Animalia
- Phylum: Chordata
- Class: Mammalia
- Order: Eulipotyphla
- Family: Soricidae
- Genus: Solisorex; Thomas, 1924
- Species: S. pearsoni

Binomial name
- Solisorex pearsoni Thomas, 1924
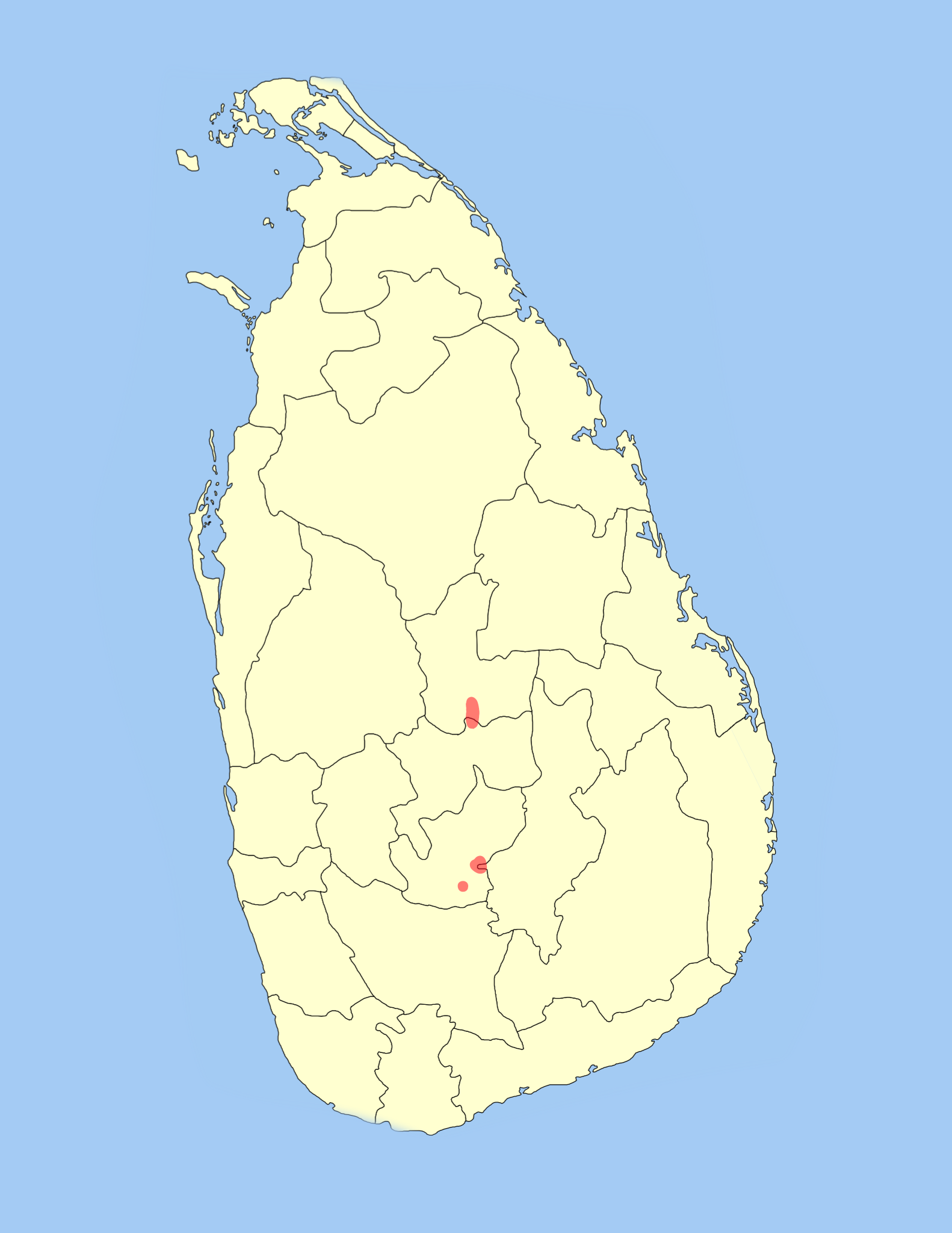
- Pearson's long-clawed shrew range

Species of mammal

Pearson's long-clawed shrew (Solisorex pearsoni) is a species of mammal in the family Soricidae. It is the only species within the genus Solisorex endemic to Sri Lanka. It is threatened by habitat loss. It is named after Joseph Pearson FRSE, Director of the Columbo Museum 1910-1933 who found it on 1 January 1924.

== Description ==
The head and body together measure 12–13 cm (4.7–5.1 in) and the tail is 6–7 cm (2.4–2.8 in). It is dark grayish-brown above, with light tips to the hairs, and paler on the underside. The claws of forefeet are long, with the middle claw about 5 mm (0.20 in) in length. The forefeet are brown in color and the tail is dark brown above and lighter below.

== Distribution ==
This species is endemic to the Central Highlands of Sri Lanka. It has been recorded from several localities, including Gammaduwa, Riverstern-Knuckles, Nuwara Eliya, Hakgala Strict Natural Reserve, and Nanu Oya. Its altitudinal range spans from 1,000 to 2,310 meters above sea level.

== Ecology ==
The species inhabits primary tropical montane evergreen forests, specifically within the wet Patana grasslands. It is thought to be semi-fossorial (partially burrowing). Evidence for this includes the capture of four individuals in long grass, suggesting an affinity for dense ground-level vegetation.
