= Kelaart's long-clawed shrew =

Conservation status
- Endangered (IUCN 3.1)

Scientific classification
- Kingdom: Animalia
- Phylum: Chordata
- Class: Mammalia
- Order: Eulipotyphla
- Family: Soricidae
- Genus: Feroculus; Kelaart, 1852
- Species: F. feroculus

Binomial name
- Feroculus feroculus (Kelaart, 1850)
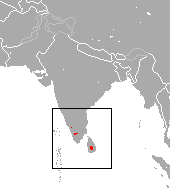
- Kelaart's long-clawed shrew range

Species of mammal

Kelaart's long-clawed shrew (Feroculus feroculus) is a species of mammal in the family Soricidae. It is the only species within the genus Feroculus. It is endemic to Sri Lanka and southern India. Its natural habitats are subtropical or tropical dry forests and grassland, and swamps. It is threatened by habitat loss. The species is named for zoologist Edward Frederick Kelaart.

Head and body length is 11–12 cm (4.3–4.7 in). Tail is 7–8 cm (2.8–3.1 in) long. Pelage cloe, soft, and short. Uniform ashy-black above, paler and glossy below. Forefeet almost white, very long and reddish claws. Tail covered by fine hairs as well as a few bristly long hairs.
