= Bornean shrew =

Conservation status
- Least Concern (IUCN 3.1)

Scientific classification
- Kingdom: Animalia
- Phylum: Chordata
- Class: Mammalia
- Order: Eulipotyphla
- Family: Soricidae
- Genus: Crocidura
- Species: C. foetida

Binomial name
- Crocidura foetida Peters, 1870
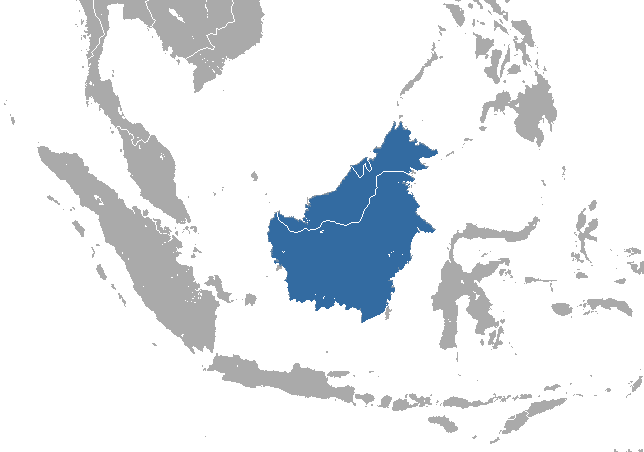
- Bornean shrew range

Species of mammal

The Bornean shrew (Crocidura foetida) is a species of mammal in the family Soricidae. It is found only on Borneo, throughout most of the island; it may or may not be present in Brunei.

Multilocus phylogenies reveal paraphyly in C. foetida. Individuals from central, south and western Borneo, integrate a monophyletic clade, that diverged around 1 million years ago from a shallow clade which includes individuals from Sabah, plus the Kinabalu shrew, C. baluensis, and the black-footed shrew, C. nigripes (Sulawesi).
