= Kinabalu shrew =

Conservation status
- Least Concern (IUCN 3.1)

Scientific classification
- Kingdom: Animalia
- Phylum: Chordata
- Class: Mammalia
- Order: Eulipotyphla
- Family: Soricidae
- Genus: Crocidura
- Species: C. baluensis

Binomial name
- Crocidura baluensis Thomas, 1898
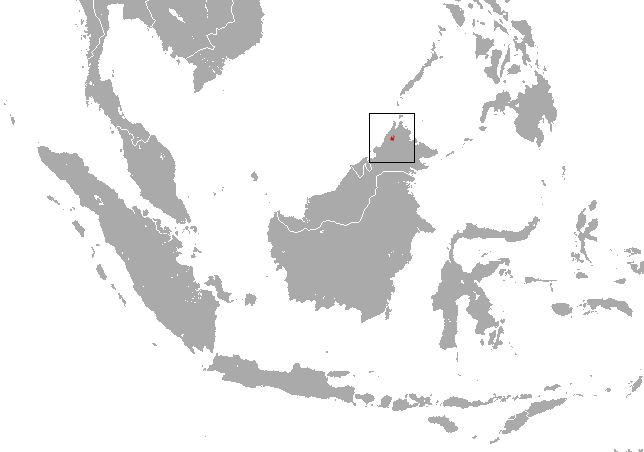
- Kinabalu shrew range

Species of mammal

The Kinabalu shrew (Crocidura baluensis) is a species in the family Soricidae. It is endemic to the mountain Mount Kinabalu on Borneo, and its sister peak, Mount Tambuyukon.

Despite its resemblance in external morphology with the mountain shrew C. lepidura (Sumatra), multilocus phylogenies reveal a recent divergence of C. baluensis from the Sabahan lineage of the Bornean shrew, C. foetida sensu lato. The latter inhabits the lower slopes in Kinabalu, up to around 1500 masl, where it is replaced by C. baluensis. The larger size and longer hair of C. baluensis respect to the lowland C. foetida sensu lato seems related to adaptation to the colder mountain conditions. Future sampling at mid-elevations in Kinabalu will be required to address whether this closely related lowland lineage represents a distinct species or if Crocidura baluensis should be redefined to include these lowland Sabahan populations

== Distribution and habitat ==
The Kinabalu shrew is native to Mount Kinabalu, where it inhabits montane rain forest (aka cloud forest) and higher-elevation subalpine shrublands and alpine meadows from 1,600 to 3,700 meters elevation. It is found in primary forests, degraded and secondary forests, and scrubland.

It is also found in montane grasslands in the Kelabit Highlands above 1000 meters elevation.
