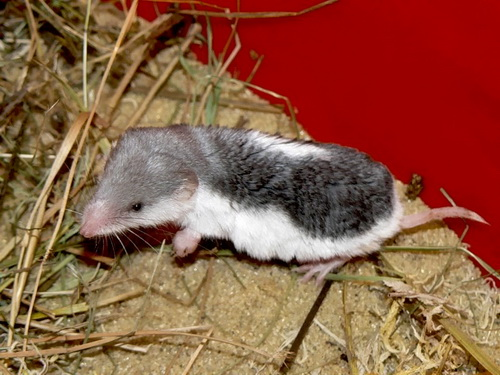
- Piebald shrew in Moscow Zoo

Conservation status
- Least Concern (IUCN 3.1)

Scientific classification
- Kingdom: Animalia
- Phylum: Chordata
- Class: Mammalia
- Order: Eulipotyphla
- Family: Soricidae
- Genus: Diplomesodon
- Species: D. pulchellus

Binomial name
- Diplomesodon pulchellus (Lichtenstein, 1823)
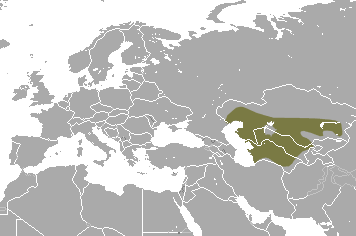
- Piebald shrew range

Synonyms
- Sorex pulchellus; Diplomesodon pulchellum

= Piebald shrew =

Species of mammal

The piebald shrew (Diplomesodon pulchellus) is a shrew found in the Turan Lowland east of the Caspian Sea in Iran, Turkmenistan and Uzbekistan.

It grows to 2 inches (5.1 cm) to 2.75 inches (7.0 cm) in length, and usually hunts for insects and lizards at night.

== Taxonomy ==
It is the only extant member of the genus Diplomesodon. In 2011, A. Cheke described a new and possibly extinct species based on a 19th-century manuscript: Diplomesodon sonnerati (Sonnerat's shrew). It was described again in 2018 to meet certain validity requirements of the ICZN code. The American Society of Mammalogists considers D. sonnerati to be a subspecies of the piebald shrew, if it exists.
