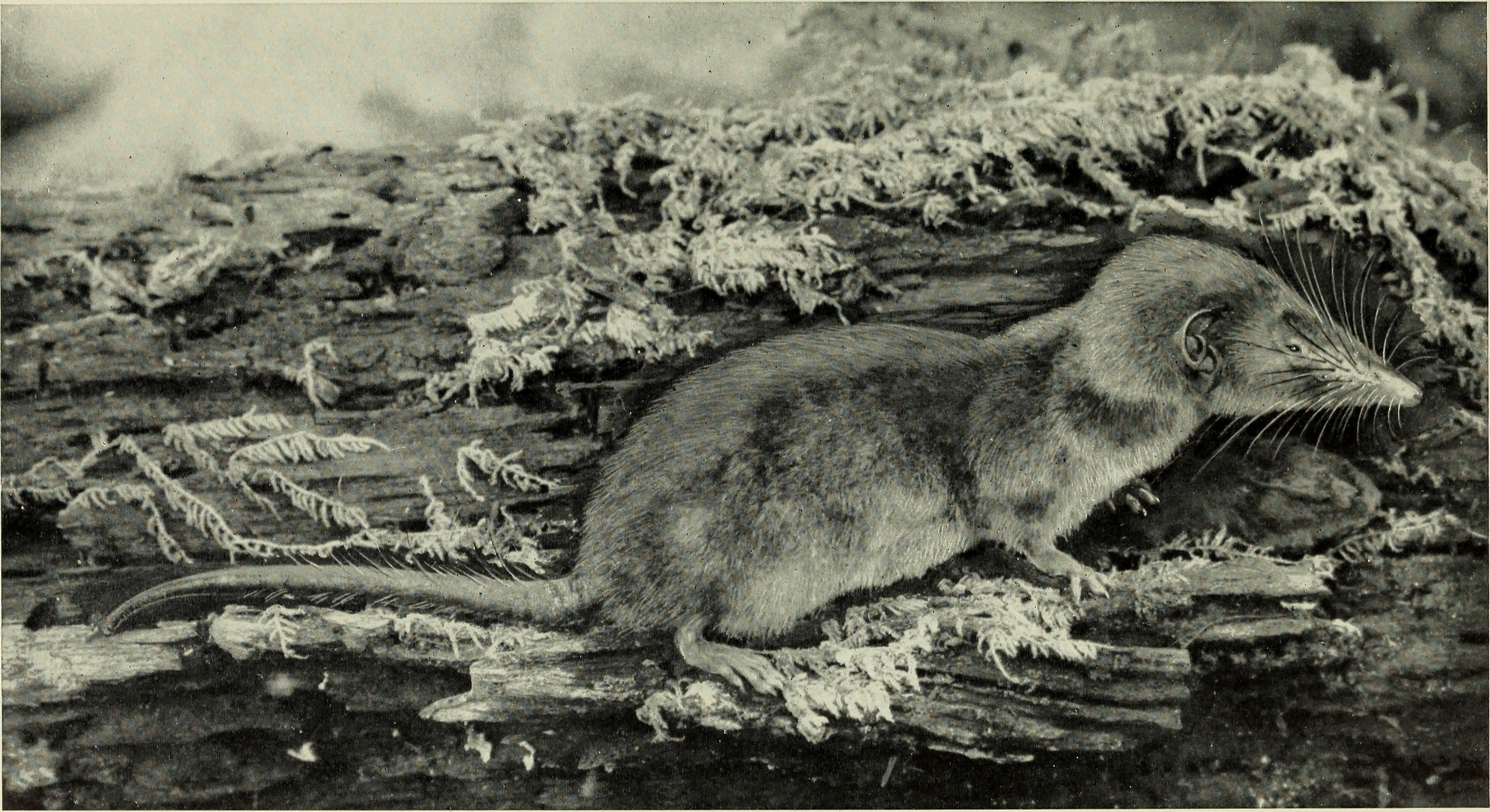

Conservation status
- Least Concern (IUCN 3.1)

Scientific classification
- Kingdom: Animalia
- Phylum: Chordata
- Class: Mammalia
- Order: Eulipotyphla
- Family: Soricidae
- Genus: Crocidura
- Species: C. olivieri

Binomial name
- Crocidura olivieri (Lesson, 1827)
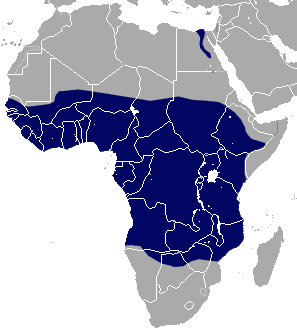
- African giant shrew range

= African giant shrew =

Species of mammal

The African giant shrew (Crocidura olivieri) is a species of white-toothed shrew. It also is known as, Mann's musk shrew, Euchareena's musk shrew, or Olivier's shrew. It is native to Africa, where it has a widespread distribution and occurs in many types of habitat. Its natural habitats are subtropical or tropical dry forest, subtropical or tropical moist lowland forest, subtropical or tropical moist montane forest, dry savanna, moist savanna, arable land, rural gardens, urban areas, and heavily degraded former forest. In the Nile Valley it is found near human habitation, where it is considered to be a pest. It is a common species and is listed by the International Union for Conservation of Nature as being of "least concern".

== Taxonomy ==
This species was first described from mummified specimens, found at Sakkara in Ancient Egyptian tombs, and included in the genus Sorex, the neotype having been collected from near Giza. (To the ancient Egyptians, the shrew represented the nocturnal side of Horus; see Animal mummy#Miscellaneous animals.) The valid name is Crocidura olivieri. Large shrews of this type still live in Egypt and it is presumed that the holotype, which has been lost, resembled them closely. Now, the original name of Crocidura flavescens is used for a different species, found solely in South Africa. About fifteen subspecies have been proposed in the past and there are dark colour morphs and pale colour morphs, however, biochemical evidence shows that all are variations of a single, but highly variable species.

== Description ==
This is a large shrew growing to a head-and-body length of 110 to 140 mm (4.3 to 5.5 in) with a tail about 80% of the body-length. The hind foot measures 21 to 23 mm (0.8 to 0.9 in). In Nigeria, this shrew weighs between 37 and 65 g (1.3 and 2.3 oz) while in Zimbabwe, it is smaller at 31 to 37 g (1.1 to 1.3 oz). The fur is variable in colour, the dorsal surface being reddish-brown, dark brown, or blackish, while the ventral surface is buffy-brown to dark grey. The tail is thickly clad with short bristles. The skull is robust and somewhat flattened, with a long rostrum and smallish braincase. The teeth are large and strong, particularly the incisors. There are three pairs of nipples and on the flanks are glands that exude a musky odour.

== Distribution and habitat ==
This shrew is present in the Nile Valley in Egypt and has a wide distribution in sub-Saharan Africa, where its range extends from Senegal to Sudan and Ethiopia, and southwards to Angola, northern Namibia and Zimbabwe. It occurs in a wide range of habitats, both wet and dry, and both forest and savanna. In Egypt, it occurs in gardens, agricultural areas, and canal embankments. When it lives in close proximity to human settlements, it may be regarded as a pest species.

== Ecology ==
The African giant shrew is a terrestrial species that is active at night, particularly just before dawn. It feeds on small invertebrates such as ants, beetles, millipedes, termites, and spiders, and possibly also on carrion. Breeding activity varies across its range but appears to take place most of the year with litter sizes averaging about four. Owls such as the barn owl, the African grass owl, and the spotted eagle-owl are among the main predators, as well as small mammals such as genets, mongooses, and wild cats.
