= Jenkins's shrew =

Jenkins' shrew

Conservation status
- Critically Endangered (IUCN 3.1)

Scientific classification
- Kingdom: Animalia
- Phylum: Chordata
- Class: Mammalia
- Order: Eulipotyphla
- Family: Soricidae
- Genus: Crocidura
- Species: C. jenkinsi

Binomial name
- Crocidura jenkinsi Chakraborty, 1978
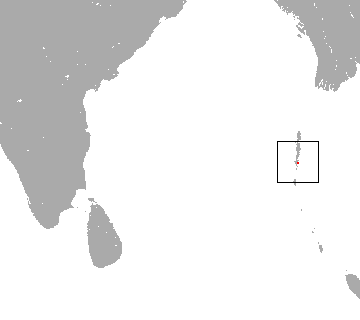
- Jenkins's shrew range

Synonyms
- Jenkin's Andaman Spiny Shrew

Species of mammal

Jenkins's shrew (Crocidura jenkinsi) is a critically endangered species of mammal in the family Soricidae. It is endemic to South Andaman Island in India.
