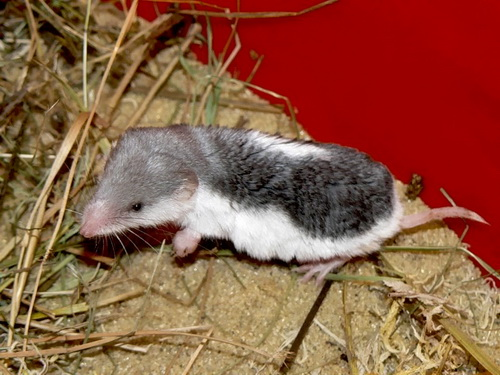
- Piebald shrew (Diplomesodon pulchellus).

Scientific classification
- Kingdom: Animalia
- Phylum: Chordata
- Class: Mammalia
- Order: Eulipotyphla
- Family: Soricidae
- Subfamily: Crocidurinae
- Genus: Diplomesodon; Brandt, 1852

Species
- Diplomesodon pulchellus; †Diplomesodon fossorius; †Diplomesodon sonnerati?

= Diplomesodon =

Diplomesodon Temporal range: Early Pleistocene - Recent

Genus of mammal

Diplomesodon is a genus of shrew that contains a single extant species, the piebald shrew (Diplomesodon pulchellus).

== Taxonomy ==
An extinct species named Diplomesodon fossorius is known from the Early Pleistocene of South Africa, very distant from the current Caspian region distribution of the piebald shrew.

Another potential member of this genus is the enigmatic Sonnerat's shrew (Diplomesodon sonnerati) which is known from no physical remains and has been described based solely on a 19th-century manuscript. Its status as a valid taxon is contentious, and even if it is indeed valid, the lack of any physical material indicates that it most likely has gone extinct. The American Society of Mammalogists considers D. sonnerati to be a subspecies of the piebald shrew, if it exists.
