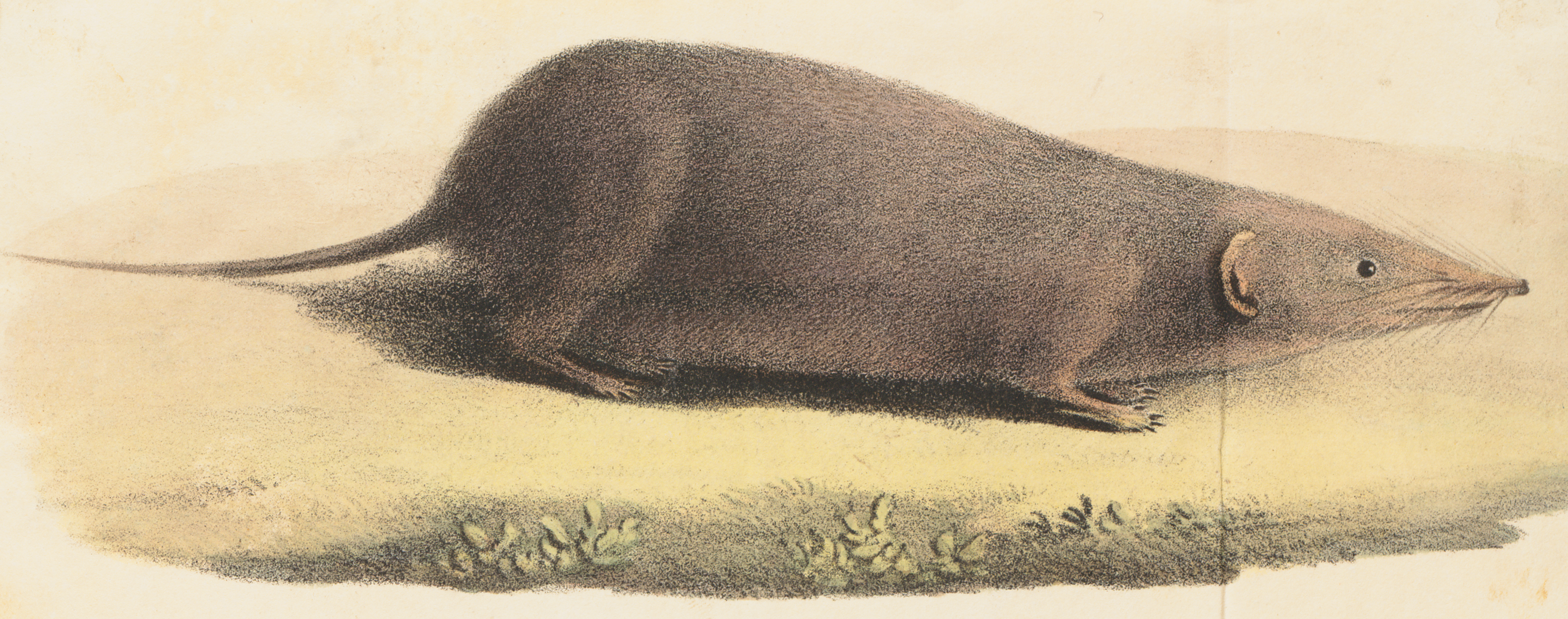

Conservation status
- Least Concern (IUCN 3.1)

Scientific classification
- Kingdom: Animalia
- Phylum: Chordata
- Class: Mammalia
- Order: Eulipotyphla
- Family: Soricidae
- Genus: Crocidura
- Species: C. flavescens

Binomial name
- Crocidura flavescens (I. Geoffroy, 1827)
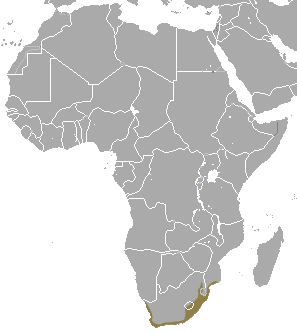
- Greater red musk shrew range

= Greater red musk shrew =

Species of mammal

The greater red musk shrew (Crocidura flavescens) is a species of mammal in the family Soricidae. It is found in Lesotho, Mozambique, South Africa, and Eswatini. Its natural habitats are moist savanna, temperate grassland, and rural gardens. Like most shrew species, C. flavescens is nocturnal. The greater red musk shrew is considered to be asocial and territorial, with males using scent marking to establish their territory. Males appear to be more aggressive than females, and their aggression increases with greater population density. Most of its fur is red brown or a light tan color, while the lower part of its body is whitish or grey in color. Another identifiable characteristic is its size, it being larger than what is typical for its genus. However, correctly identifying any member of the genus Crocidura is difficult and requires inquiry from a professional.
