= Nimba shrew =

Conservation status
- Near Threatened (IUCN 3.1)

Scientific classification
- Kingdom: Animalia
- Phylum: Chordata
- Class: Mammalia
- Order: Eulipotyphla
- Family: Soricidae
- Genus: Crocidura
- Species: C. nimbae

Binomial name
- Crocidura nimbae Heim de Balsac, 1956
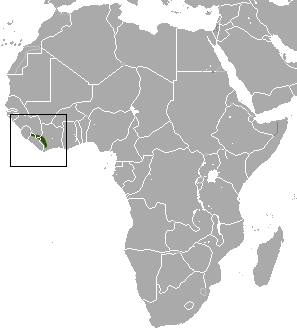
- Nimba shrew range

Species of mammal

The Nimba shrew (Crocidura nimbae) is a species of mammal in the family Soricidae. It is found in Ivory Coast, Guinea, Liberia, and Sierra Leone. Its natural habitat is subtropical or tropical moist lowland forests.
