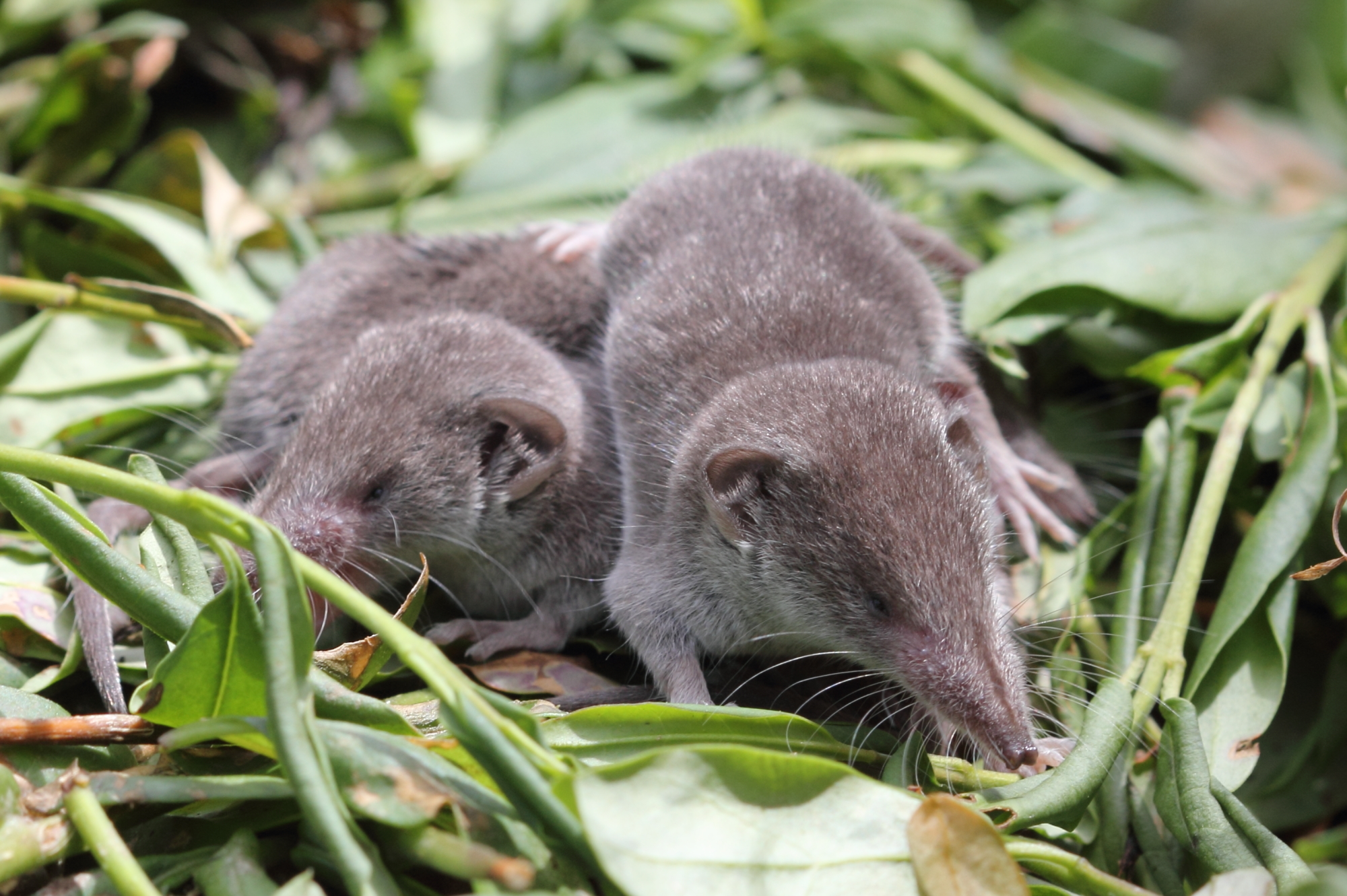

Conservation status
- Least Concern (IUCN 3.1)

Scientific classification
- Kingdom: Animalia
- Phylum: Chordata
- Class: Mammalia
- Order: Eulipotyphla
- Family: Soricidae
- Genus: Crocidura
- Species: C. russula

Binomial name
- Crocidura russula (Hermann, 1780)
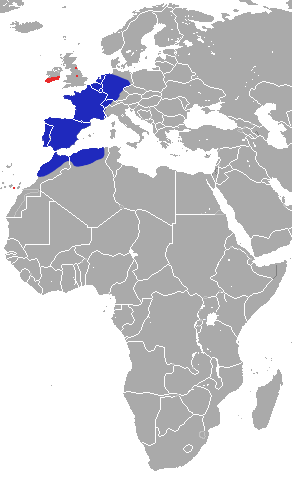
- Greater white-toothed shrew range Blue: native Red: introduced

= Greater white-toothed shrew =

Species of mammal

The greater white-toothed shrew (Crocidura russula) is a small insectivorous mammal found in Europe and North Africa.

It is the most common of the white-toothed shrews. This species is found along the Mediterranean, Netherlands, Belgium, Ireland, Germany and Portugal; in addition, the Osorio shrew of the Canary island of Gran Canaria, originally described as a separate species (Crocidura osorio), was later discovered to be a population of introduced greater white-toothed shrew. Furthermore, a subspecies of the greater white-toothed shrew, Crocidura russula ibicensis, is found on the Mediterranean island of Ibiza. In April 2008, the greater white-toothed shrew was discovered in Ireland as well, and in 2021 in England, discovered by a cat named Jeff. Its preferred habitats are grassland and woodland. It is slightly larger than the lesser white-toothed shrew but otherwise very similar and can often be distinguished only by close inspection of its teeth which are unpigmented.

== Physical description ==
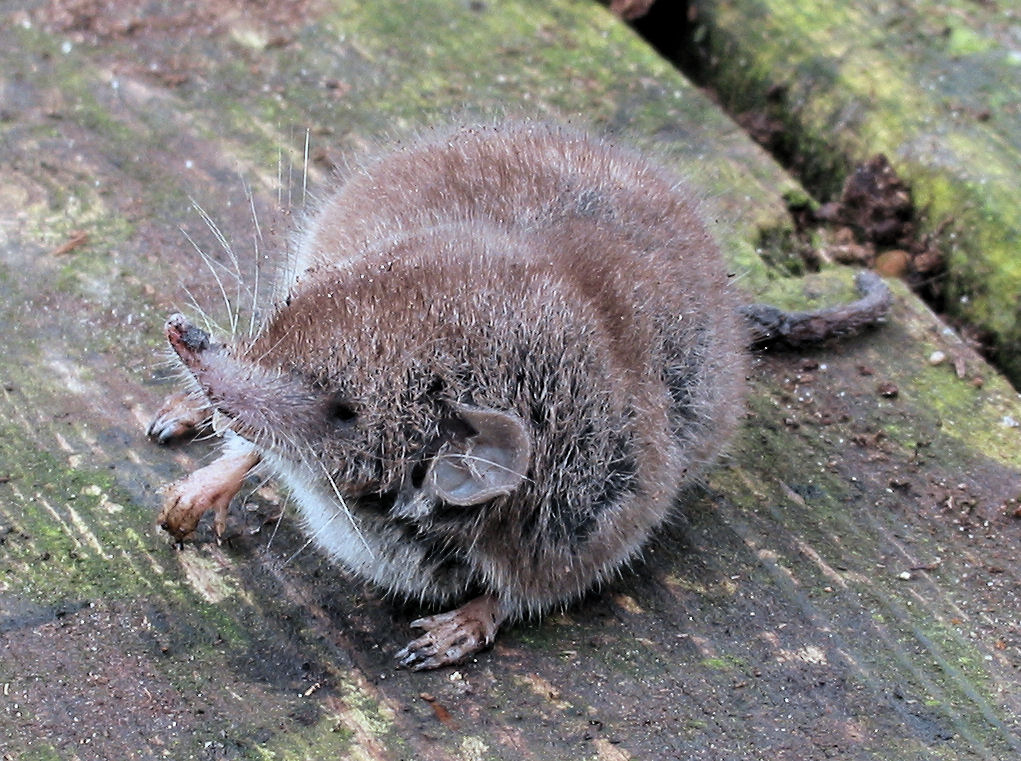
C. russula

The greater white-toothed shrew is distinguished by a careful examination of its unpigmented teeth. Like other white-toothed shrews, C. russula lacks the deposition of iron in their enamel at the tips of their teeth. This particular species has a greyish or reddish brown upper coat with a yellowish grey coat in the underside. The greater white-toothed shrews are part of the medium-sized shrews and weigh around 11 to 14 grams. The head and body length of C. russula is about 6 to 9 cm and the tail length averages to about 3 to 4.3 cm.

== Habitat ==
The greater white-toothed shrew is found in temperate regions with plentiful insects. They are generally found in habitats such as grasslands, woodlands, hedgegrows and prime agricultural areas. To prepare for colder seasons, these shrews can be found living near farms and gardens. The greater white-toothed shrews tend to build their nest under stones, logs and in abandoned burrows. Typically these shrews are found at altitudes below 1000 metres.

== Diet ==
The greater white toothed shrew is a carnivore, feeding mainly on invertebrates and occasionally small rodents, lizards and small amphibians.

== Predation ==
The greater white-toothed shrew is preyed upon by several animals; owls (such as Tyto alba), snakes, and small carnivorous mammals such as weasels and genets are the main predators of C. russula. In order to avoid predation, the greater white-toothed shrews can be found under cover of vegetation or leaf litter when active. Cryptic coloration is also used as an effective method to avoid predation.

== Behaviour ==
The greater white-toothed shrews are classified as semi-social mammals. During winter, C. russula are found sharing nests and enter torpor. Mated pairs are found guarding their territories together. C. russula are highly monogamous and exhibit a female-biased dispersal, which is highly uncommon in mammals. This dispersal pattern can also occur due to infiltration and migration to empty breeding sites. Nonetheless, this dispersal pattern is a preventative measure for inbreeding. The greater white-toothed shrew can be very vocal. C. russula possess a primitive form of echolocation where they produce a high pitched twittering call to interpret their environment. The use of this laryngeal call and vibrissae allow the shrews to find their way around their environment. There have not been any concrete reports on the modes of communication used by this species, however, vocalisation and tactile and chemical cues are likely to be used.

== Reproduction ==
The greater white-toothed shrew typically experiences one breeding season in its entire lifetime, whereby fertilisation occurs right after parturition. C. russula breed mainly from March to September, producing about four litters which can contain anywhere from 2 to 10 young. The sexual maturity in this species is fairly quick. The litters remain in their parental territory till the next breeding season.

== Life span ==
C. russula has a lifespan of about 18 months in the wild, but can survive for 30 months in captivity under laboratory conditions.

== Role in the ecosystem ==
C. russula serves as a prey species to many animals, however, an abundance in this species may lead to a decline in other small mammals such as pygmy shrews. In April 2008, the greater white-toothed shrew was discovered in Ireland and has since spread rapidly through the southern counties. While the introduction of the species will possibly sustain threatened birds of prey, such as the barn owl, the nonnative mammal could threaten some of the smaller native species, such as the Eurasian pygmy shrew.
