= Goliath shrew =

Conservation status
- Least Concern (IUCN 3.1)

Scientific classification
- Kingdom: Animalia
- Phylum: Chordata
- Class: Mammalia
- Order: Eulipotyphla
- Family: Soricidae
- Genus: Crocidura
- Species: C. goliath

Binomial name
- Crocidura goliath Thomas, 1906
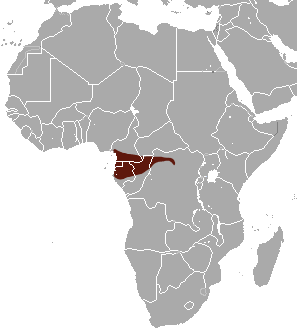
- Goliath shrew range

Species of mammal

The goliath shrew (Crocidura goliath) is a species of mammal in the family Soricidae. It is found in Cameroon, Central African Republic, Republic of the Congo, Democratic Republic of the Congo, Equatorial Guinea, and Gabon. Its natural habitat is subtropical or tropical moist lowland forests.
