= Malayan shrew =

Conservation status
- Least Concern (IUCN 3.1)

Scientific classification
- Kingdom: Animalia
- Phylum: Chordata
- Class: Mammalia
- Order: Eulipotyphla
- Family: Soricidae
- Genus: Crocidura
- Species: C. malayana

Binomial name
- Crocidura malayana Robinson & Kloss, 1911
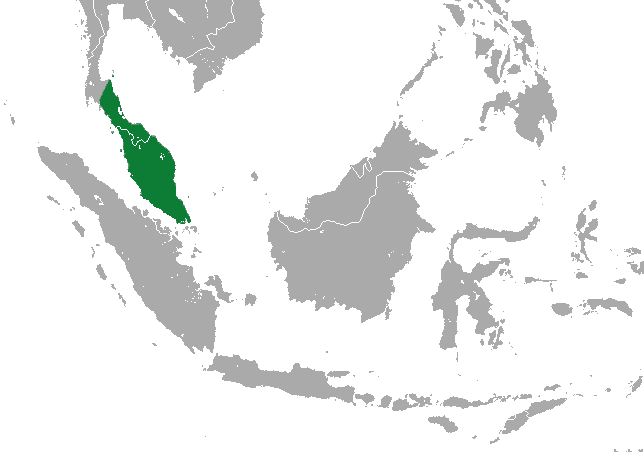
- Malayan shrew range

Species of mammal

The Malayan shrew (Crocidura malayana) is a species of mammal in the family Soricidae. It is endemic to the Malay Peninsula and Singapore.
