= Elongated shrew =

Conservation status
- Least Concern (IUCN 3.1)

Scientific classification
- Kingdom: Animalia
- Phylum: Chordata
- Class: Mammalia
- Order: Eulipotyphla
- Family: Soricidae
- Genus: Crocidura
- Species: C. elongata

Binomial name
- Crocidura elongata Miller & Hollister, 1921
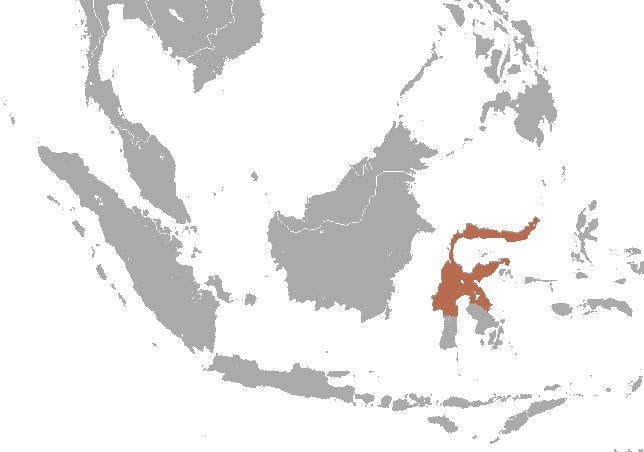
- Elongated shrew range

Species of mammal

The elongated shrew (Crocidura elongata) is a species of mammal in the family Soricidae. It is endemic to the island of Sulawesi in Indonesia. It lives in the forests of central, northern, and eastern Sulawesi from 200 to 2000 meters elevation.
