= Mossy forest shrew =

Conservation status
- Vulnerable (IUCN 3.1)

Scientific classification
- Kingdom: Animalia
- Phylum: Chordata
- Class: Mammalia
- Order: Eulipotyphla
- Family: Soricidae
- Genus: Crocidura
- Species: C. musseri

Binomial name
- Crocidura musseri Ruedi & Vogel, 1995
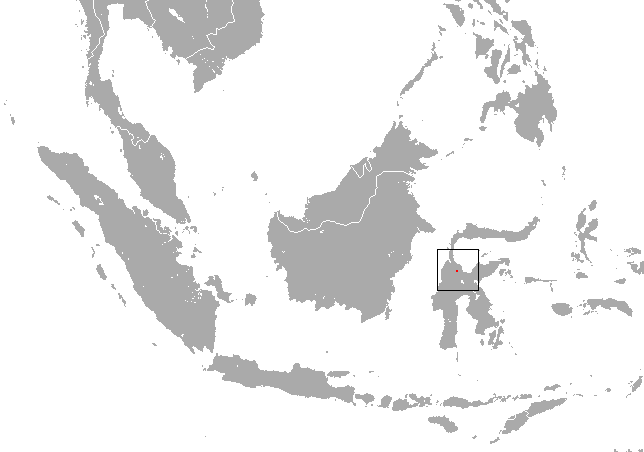
- Mossy forest shrew range

Species of mammal

The mossy forest shrew (Crocidura musseri) is a species of shrew native to Indonesia.
