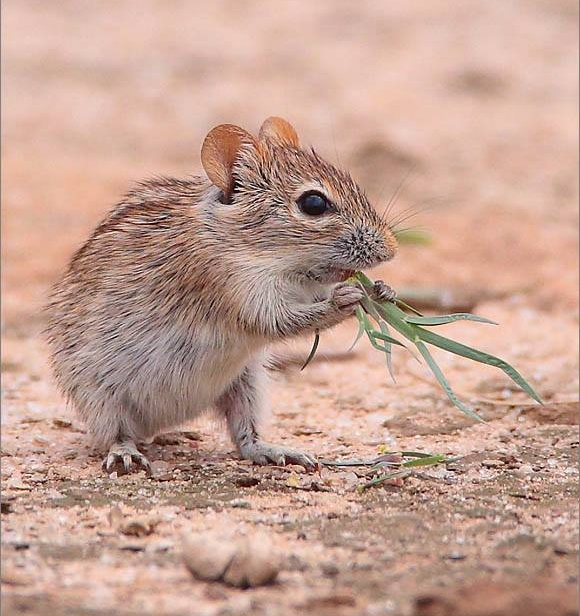
- Four-striped grass mouse (Rhabdomys pumilio)

Scientific classification
- Kingdom: Animalia
- Phylum: Chordata
- Class: Mammalia
- Order: Rodentia
- Family: Muridae
- Subfamily: Murinae
- Tribe: Arvicanthini; Lecompte et al., 2008

Genera
- See text

= Arvicanthini =

Arvicanthini Temporal range: Late Miocene - present, 7–0 Ma

Tribe of rodents

Arvicanthini is a tribe of muroid rodents in the subfamily Murinae. Almost all recent species in this tribe are or were found in Africa aside from one species, the Indian bush rat (Golunda ellioti), which is found in South Asia and Iran. However, some fossil Golunda species from India and the genus Parapelomys (known to have inhabited Arabia and Pakistan) are thought to have also occurred outside Africa, and one species in the fossil genus Saidomys may have also occurred in Afghanistan.

The genus Canariomys inhabited the Canary Islands until being driven to extinction by early human settlers.

== Species ==
=== Extant species ===
Species in the tribe include:

- Aethomys division
  - Genus Aethomys - bush rats
    - Bocage's rock rat, Aethomys bocagei
    - Red rock rat, Aethomys chrysophilus
    - Grant's rock rat, Aethomys (Micaelamys) granti
    - Hinde's rock rat, Aethomys hindei
    - Tete veld aethomys, Aethomys ineptus
    - Kaiser's rock rat, Aethomys kaiseri
    - Namaqua rock rat, Aethomys (Micaelamys) namaquensis
    - Nyika rock rat, Aethomys nyikae
    - Silinda rock rat, Aethomys silindensis
    - Tinfields rock rat, Aethomys stannarius
    - Thomas's rock rat, Aethomys thomasi
- Arvicanthis division
  - Genus Arvicanthis - unstriped grass mice
    - Abyssinian grass rat, Arvicanthis abyssinicus
    - Sudanian grass rat, Arvicanthis ansorgei
    - Blick's grass rat, Arvicanthis blicki
    - Nairobi grass rat, Arvicanthis nairobae
    - Neumann's grass rat, Arvicanthis neumanni
    - African grass rat, Arvicanthis niloticus
    - Guinean grass rat, Arvicanthis rufinus
  - Genus Desmomys
    - Harrington's rat, Desmomys harringtoni
    - Yalden's rat, Desmomys yaldeni
  - Genus Lemniscomys - striped grass mice
    - Barbary striped grass mouse, Lemniscomys barbarus
    - Bellier's striped grass mouse, Lemniscomys bellieri
    - Griselda's striped grass mouse, Lemniscomys griselda
    - Hoogstraal's striped grass mouse, Lemniscomys hoogstraali
    - Senegal one-striped grass mouse, Lemniscomys linulus
    - Buffoon striped grass mouse, Lemniscomys macculus
    - Mittendorf's striped grass mouse, Lemniscomys mittendorfi
    - Single-striped grass mouse, Lemniscomys rosalia
    - Rosevear's striped grass mouse, Lemniscomys roseveari
    - Typical striped grass mouse, Lemniscomys striatus
    - Heuglin's striped grass mouse, Lemniscomys zebra
  - Genus Mylomys (African Groove-toothed Rat)
    - African groove-toothed rat, Mylomys dybowskii
    - Ethiopian mylomys, Mylomys rex
  - Genus Pelomys - groove-toothed creek rats
    - Bell groove-toothed swamp rat, Pelomys campanae
    - Creek groove-toothed swamp rat, Pelomys fallax
    - Hopkins's groove-toothed swamp rat, Pelomys hopkinsi
    - Issel's groove-toothed swamp rat, Pelomys isseli
    - Least groove-toothed swamp rat, Pelomys minor
  - Genus Rhabdomys (Four-striped Grass Mouse)
    - Rhabdomys dilectus
    - Four-striped grass mouse, Rhabdomys pumilio
- Dasymys division
  - Genus Dasymys - shaggy swamp rats
    - Glover Allen's shaggy rat, Dasymys alleni
    - Crawford-Cabral's shaggy rat, Dasymys cabrali
    - Cape shaggy rat, Dasymys capensis
    - Fox's shaggy rat, Dasymys foxi
    - Dasymys griseifrons
    - African marsh rat, Dasymys incomtus
    - Dasymys longipilosus
    - Montane shaggy rat, Dasymys montanus
    - Angolan marsh rat, Dasymys nudipes
    - Robert's shaggy rat, Dasymys robertsii
    - West African shaggy rat, Dasymys rufulus
    - Rwandan shaggy rat, Dasymys rwandae
    - Dasymys shortridgei
    - Tanzanian shaggy rat, Dasymys sua
- Golunda division
  - Genus Golunda (Indian bush rat)
    - Indian bush rat, Golunda ellioti
- Hybomys division
  - Genus Dephomys - defua rats
    - Defua rat, Dephomys defua
    - Ivory Coast rat, Dephomys eburneae
  - Genus Hybomys - hump-nosed mice
    - Eisentraut's striped mouse, Hybomys badius
    - Father Basilio's striped mouse, Hybomys basilii
    - Moon striped mouse, Hybomys lunaris
    - Miller's striped mouse, Hybomys planifrons
    - Temminck's striped mouse, Hybomys trivirgatus
    - Peters's striped mouse, Hybomys univittatus
  - Genus Stochomys (Target Rat)
    - Target rat, Stochomys longicaudatus
- Oenomys division
  - Genus Grammomys
    - Arid thicket rat, Grammomys aridulus
    - Grammomys brevirostris
    - Bunting's thicket rat, Grammomys buntingi
    - Gray-headed thicket rat, Grammomys caniceps
    - Mozambique thicket rat, Grammomys cometes
    - Woodland thicket rat, Grammomys dolichurus
    - Forest thicket rat, Grammomys dryas
    - Giant thicket rat, Grammomys gigas
    - Ruwenzori thicket rat, Grammomys ibeanus
    - Eastern rainforest grammomys or eastern rainforest thicket rat, Grammomys kuru
    - Macmillan's thicket rat, Grammomys macmillani
    - Ethiopian thicket rat, Grammomys minnae
    - Shining thicket rat, Grammomys poensis
  - Genus Lamottemys
    - Mount Oku rat, Lamottemys okuensis
  - Genus Oenomys - rufous-nosed rats
    - Common rufous-nosed rat, Oenomys hypoxanthus
    - Ghana rufous-nosed rat, Oenomys ornatus
  - Genus Thallomys - acacia rats
    - Loring's rat, Thallomys loringi
    - Black-tailed tree rat, Thallomys nigricauda
    - Acacia rat, Thallomys paedulcus
    - Shortridge's rat, Thallomys shortridgei
  - Genus Thamnomys - thicket rats
    - Kemp's thicket rat, Thamnomys kempi
    - Hatt's thicket rat, Thamnomys major
    - Charming thicket rat, Thamnomys venustus

=== Fossil genera ===
- Arvicanthis division
  - Genus †Canariomys - Canary Islands giant rats (Pleistocene to Holocene of the Canary Islands)
    - †Tenerife giant rat, Canariomys bravoi
    - †Gran Canaria giant rat, Canariomys tamarani
- †Parapelomys (Pliocene of India, Pakistan, Arabia, and Ethiopia)
  - †Parapelomys robertsi
- †Saharamys (Late Miocene of Egypt)
  - †Saharamys misrensis
- †Saidomys (Pliocene of Egypt, Ethiopia, Kenya, and possibly Afghanistan)
  - †Saidomys afarensis
  - †?Saidomys afghanensis (alternately placed in Karnimata)
