= List of mammals of Uganda =

This is a list of the mammal species recorded in Uganda. Of the 331 mammal species in Uganda, seven are endangered, twenty-one are vulnerable, and seventeen are near threatened.

The following tags are used to highlight each species' conservation status as assessed by the International Union for Conservation of Nature:

EX	Extinct	No reasonable doubt that the last individual has died.
EW	Extinct in the wild	Known only to survive in captivity or as a naturalized populations well outside its previous range.
CR	Critically endangered	The species is in imminent risk of extinction in the wild.
EN	Endangered	The species is facing an extremely high risk of extinction in the wild.
VU	Vulnerable	The species is facing a high risk of extinction in the wild.
NT	Near threatened	The species does not meet any of the criteria that would categorise it as risking extinction but it is likely to do so in the future.
LC	Least concern	There are no current identifiable risks to the species.
DD	Data deficient	There is inadequate information to make an assessment of the risks to this species.

Some species were assessed using an earlier set of criteria. Species assessed using this system have the following instead of near threatened and least concern categories:

LR/cd	Lower risk/conservation dependent	Species which were the focus of conservation programmes and may have moved into a higher risk category if that programme was discontinued.
LR/nt	Lower risk/near threatened	Species which are close to being classified as vulnerable but are not the subject of conservation programmes.
LR/lc	Lower risk/least concern	Species for which there are no identifiable risks.

== Order: Afrosoricida (tenrecs and golden moles) ==
The order Afrosoricida contains the golden moles of southern Africa and the tenrecs of Madagascar and Africa, two families of small mammals that were traditionally part of the order Insectivora.

- Family: Tenrecidae (tenrecs)
  - Subfamily: Potamogalinae
    - Genus: Micropotamogale
      - Ruwenzori otter shrew, Micropotamogale ruwenzorii NT
    - Genus: Potamogale
      - Giant otter shrew, Potamogale velox LC
- Family: Chrysochloridae
  - Subfamily: Chrysochlorinae
    - Genus: Chrysochloris
      - Stuhlmann's golden mole, Chrysochloris stuhlmanni LC

== Order: Macroscelidea (elephant shrews) ==
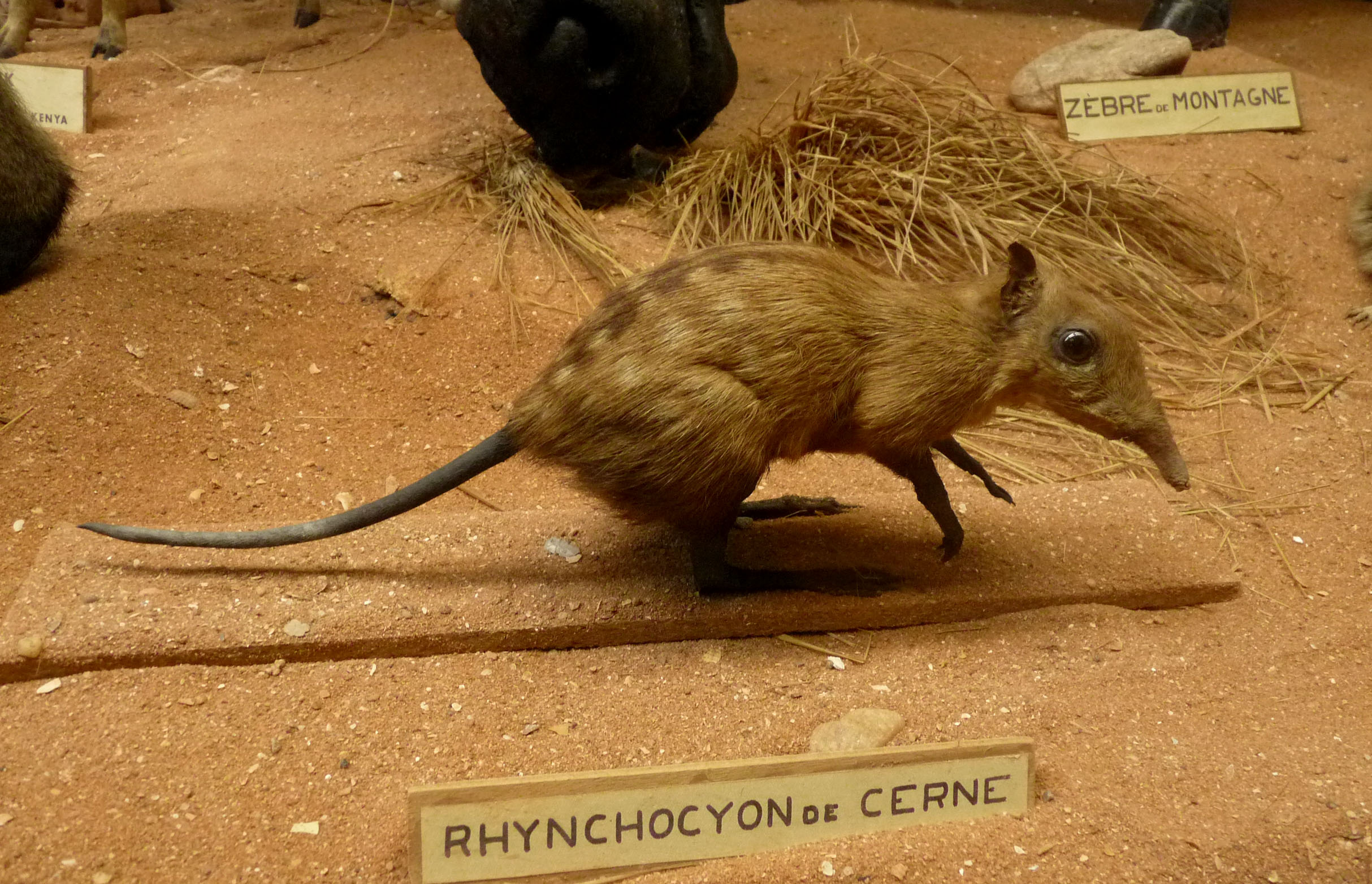
Checkered elephant shrew

Often called sengis, the elephant shrews or jumping shrews are native to southern Africa. Their common English name derives from their elongated flexible snout and their resemblance to the true shrews.

- Family: Macroscelididae (elephant shrews)
  - Genus: Elephantulus
    - Short-snouted elephant shrew, Elephantulus brachyrhynchus LC
    - Dusky-footed elephant shrew, Elephantulus fuscipes DD
    - Rufous elephant shrew, Elephantulus rufescens LC
  - Genus: Rhynchocyon
    - Checkered elephant shrew, R. cirnei LC

== Order: Tubulidentata (aardvarks) ==
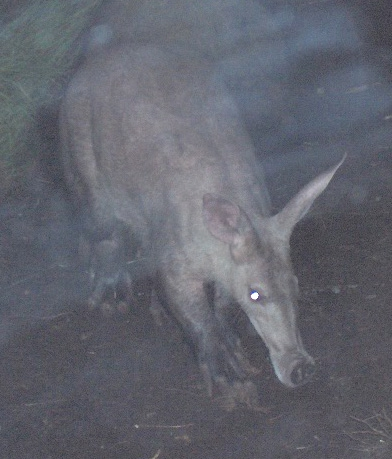
Aardvark

The order Tubulidentata consists of a single species, the aardvark. Tubulidentata are characterised by their teeth which lack a pulp cavity and form thin tubes which are continuously worn down and replaced.

- Family: Orycteropodidae
  - Genus: Orycteropus
    - Aardvark, O. afer LC

== Order: Hyracoidea (hyraxes) ==
The hyraxes are any of four species of fairly small, thickset, herbivorous mammals in the order Hyracoidea. About the size of a domestic cat they are well-furred, with rounded bodies and a stumpy tail. They are native to Africa and the Middle East.

- Family: Procaviidae (hyraxes)
  - Genus: Dendrohyrax
    - Western tree hyrax, Dendrohyrax dorsalis LC
  - Genus: Heterohyrax
    - Yellow-spotted rock hyrax, Heterohyrax brucei LC
  - Genus: Procavia
    - Cape hyrax, Procavia capensis LC

== Order: Proboscidea (elephants) ==
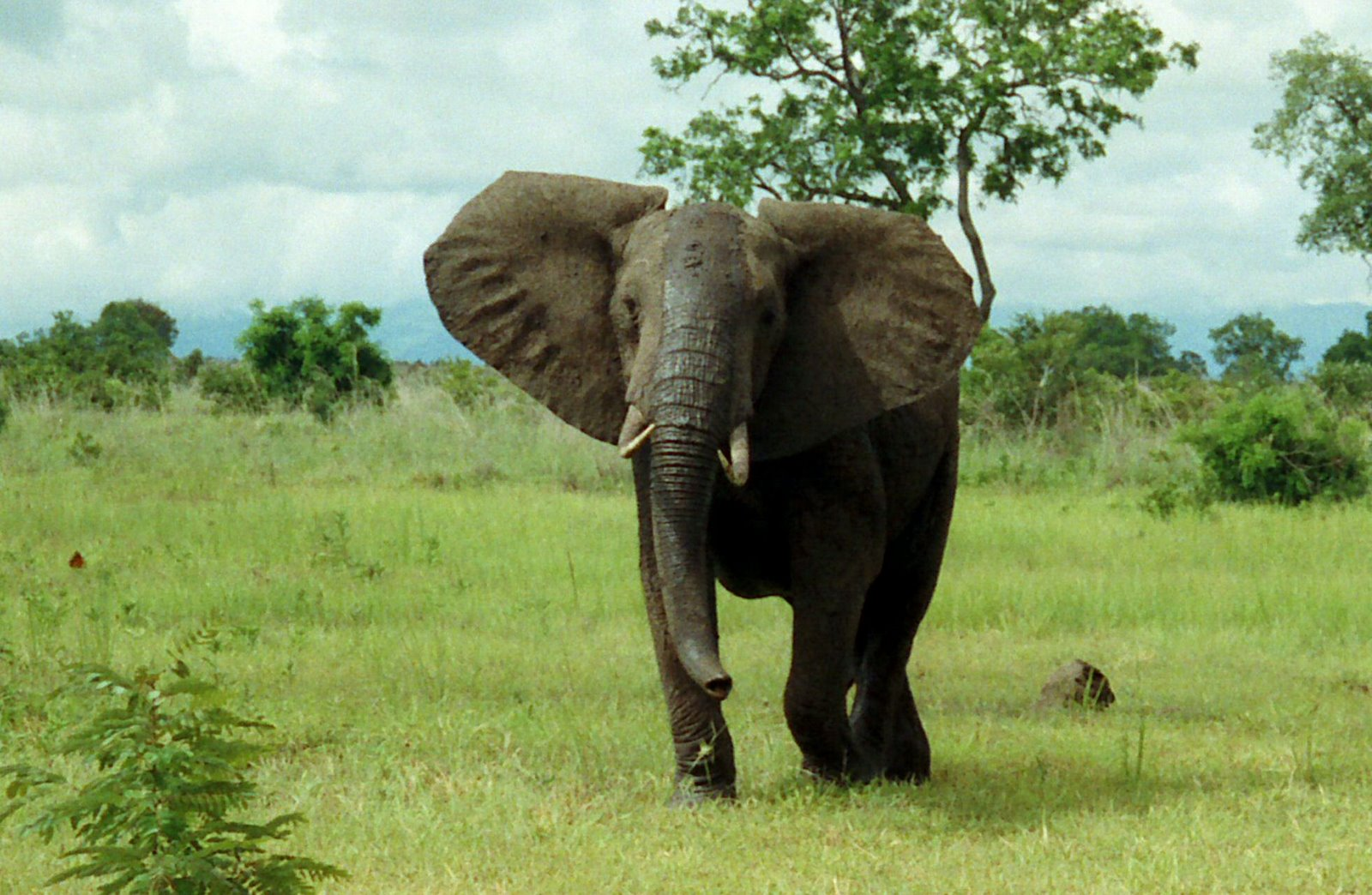
African bush elephant

The elephants comprise three living species and are the largest living land animals.

- Family: Elephantidae (elephants)
  - Genus: Loxodonta
    - African bush elephant, L. africana EN
    - African forest elephant, L. cyclotis CR

== Order: Primates ==
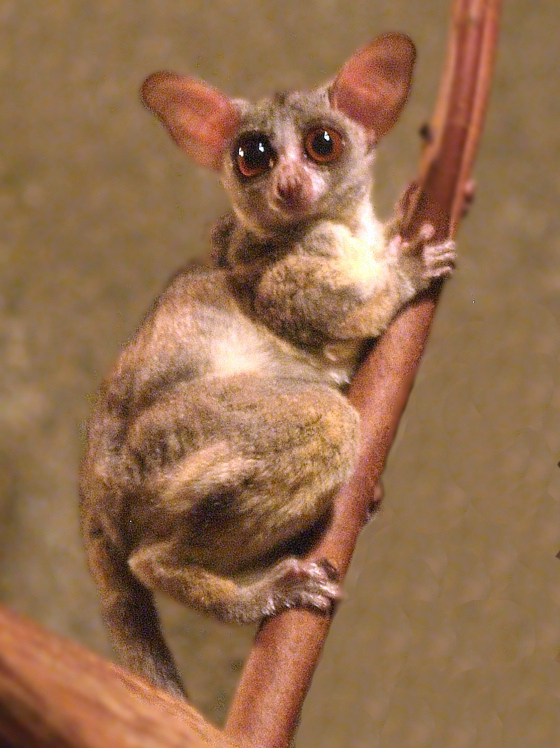
Senegal bushbaby

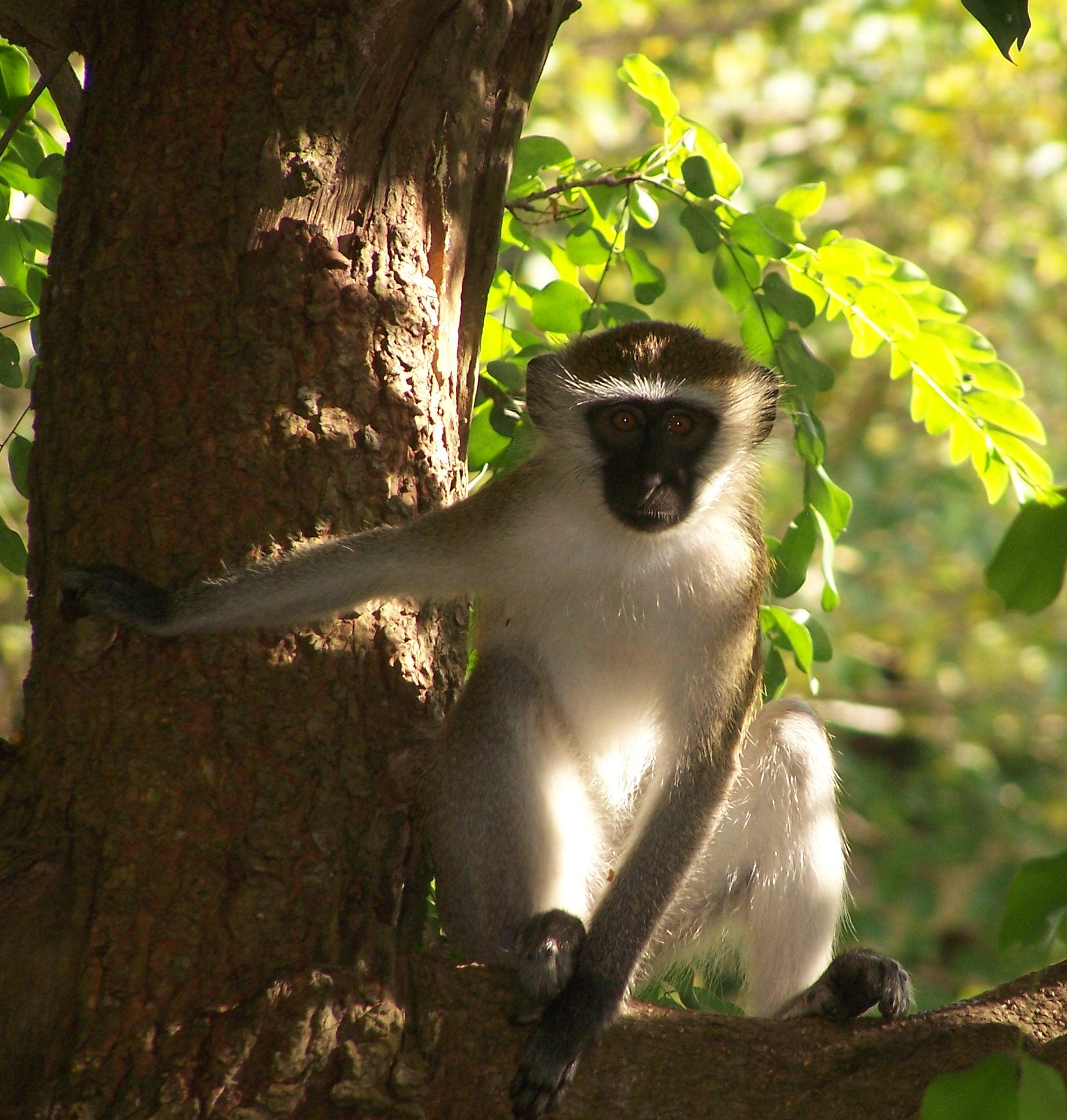
Vervet monkey

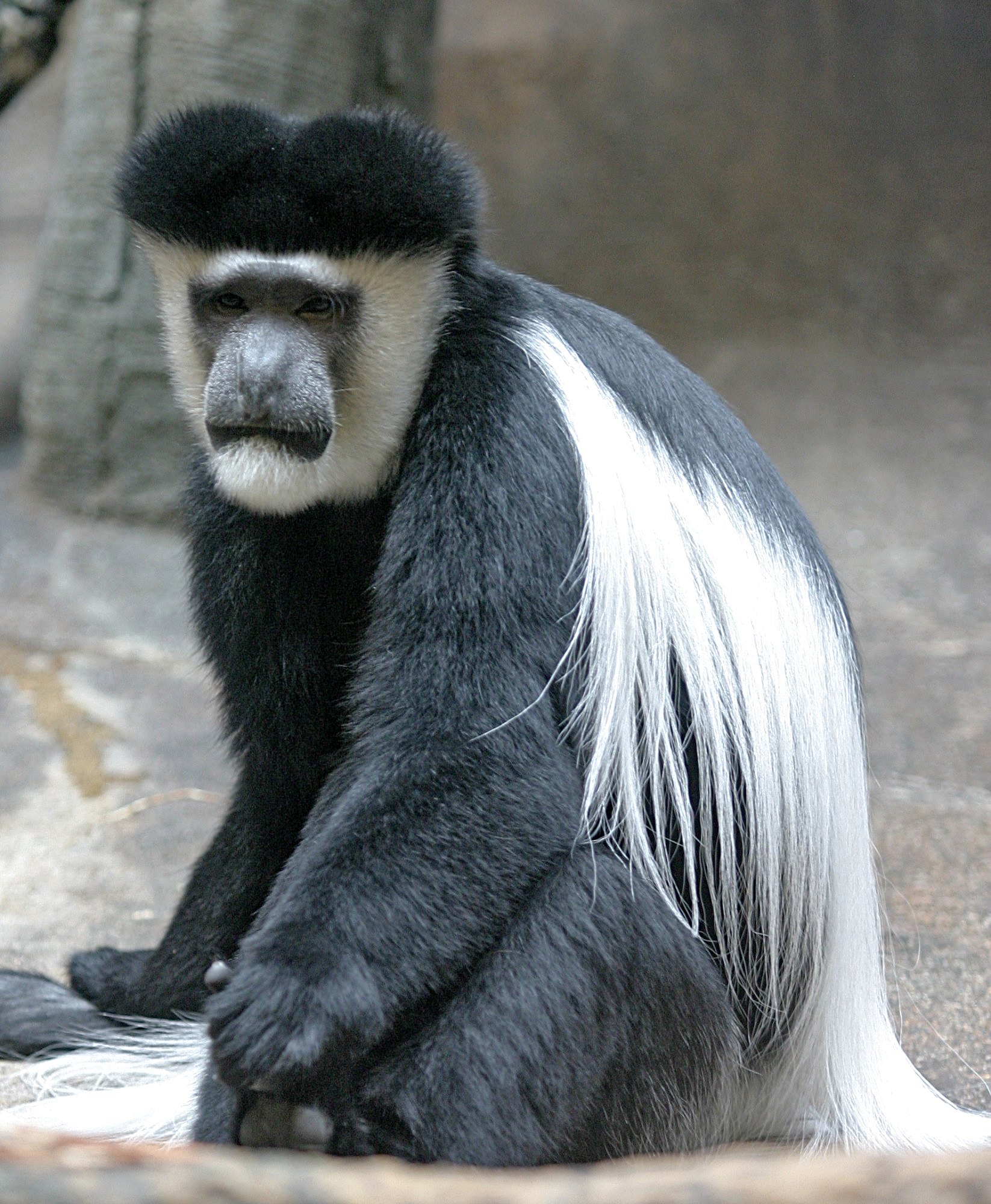
Mantled guereza

The order Primates contains humans and their closest relatives: lemurs, lorisoids, tarsiers, monkeys, and apes.

- Suborder: Strepsirrhini
  - Infraorder: Lemuriformes
    - Superfamily: Lorisoidea
      - Family: Lorisidae (lorises, bushbabies)
        - Genus: Perodicticus
          - Potto, Perodicticus potto LR/lc
      - Family: Galagidae
        - Genus: Galago
          - Dusky bushbaby, Galago matschiei LR/nt
          - Senegal bushbaby, Galago senegalensis LR/lc
        - Genus: Galagoides
          - Thomas's bushbaby, Galagoides thomasi LR/lc
          - Prince Demidoff's bushbaby, Galagoides demidovii LR/lc
        - Genus: Otolemur
          - Brown greater galago, Otolemur crassicaudatus LR/lc
- Suborder: Haplorhini
  - Infraorder: Simiiformes
    - Parvorder: Catarrhini
      - Superfamily: Cercopithecoidea
        - Family: Cercopithecidae (Old World monkeys)
          - Genus: Erythrocebus
            - Patas monkey, Erythrocebus patas LR/lc
          - Genus: Chlorocebus
            - Vervet monkey, Chlorocebus pygerythrus LR/lc
            - Tantalus monkey, Chlorocebus tantalus LR/lc
          - Genus: Cercopithecus
            - Red-tailed monkey, Cercopithecus ascanius LR/lc
            - L'Hoest's monkey, Cercopithecus lhoesti LR/nt
            - Blue monkey, Cercopithecus mitis LR/lc
            - De Brazza's monkey, Cercopithecus neglectus LR/lc
            - Crested mona monkey, Cercopithecus pogonias LC
          - Genus: Lophocebus
            - Uganda mangabey Lophocebus ugandae
          - Genus: Papio
            - Olive baboon, Papio anubis LR/lc
          - Subfamily: Colobinae
            - Genus: Colobus
              - Angola colobus, Colobus angolensis LR/lc
              - Mantled guereza, Colobus guereza LR/lc
            - Genus: Procolobus
              - Eastern colobus, Procolobus rufomitratus LC
              - Ugandan red colobus, Procolobus tephrosceles EN
      - Superfamily: Hominoidea
        - Family: Hominidae
          - Subfamily: Homininae
            - Tribe: Gorillini
              - Genus: Gorilla
                - Eastern gorilla, Gorilla beringei EN
                  - Mountain gorilla, Gorilla beringei beringei EN
            - Tribe: Panini
              - Genus: Pan
                - Common chimpanzee, Pan troglodytes EN

== Order: Rodentia (rodents) ==
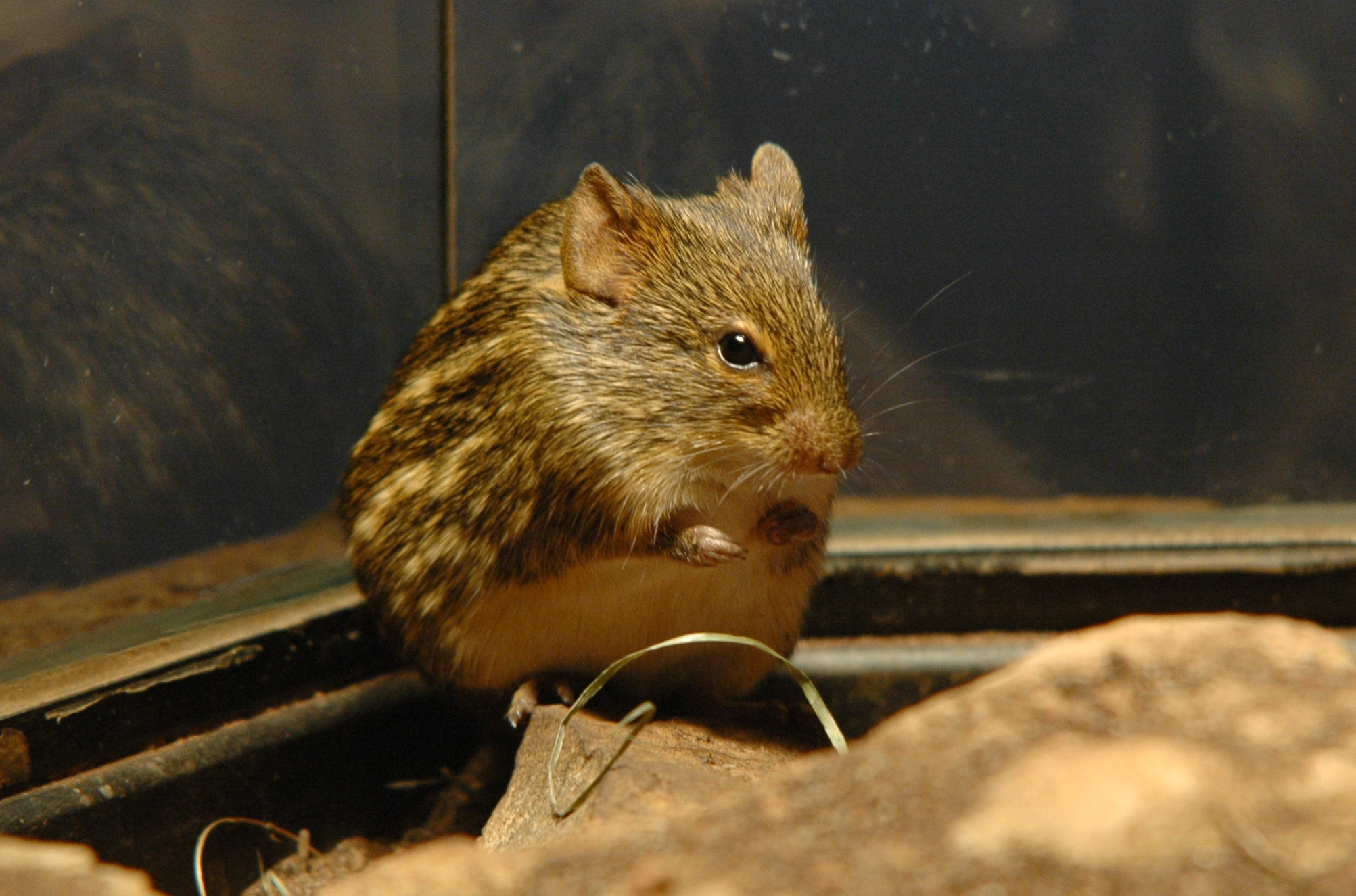
Typical striped grass mouse

Rodents make up the largest order of mammals, with over 40% of mammalian species. They have two incisors in the upper and lower jaw which grow continually and must be kept short by gnawing. Most rodents are small though the capybara can weigh up to 45 kg (99 lb).

- Suborder: Hystricognathi
  - Family: Bathyergidae
    - Genus: Cryptomys
      - Ochre mole-rat, Cryptomys ochraceocinereus DD
  - Family: Hystricidae (Old World porcupines)
    - Genus: Atherurus
      - African brush-tailed porcupine, Atherurus africanus LC
    - Genus: Hystrix
      - Cape porcupine, Hystrix africaeaustralis LC
      - Crested porcupine, Hystrix cristata LC
  - Family: Thryonomyidae (cane rats)
    - Genus: Thryonomys
      - Lesser cane rat, Thryonomys gregorianus LC
      - Greater cane rat, Thryonomys swinderianus LC
- Suborder: Sciurognathi
  - Family: Anomaluridae
    - Subfamily: Anomalurinae
      - Genus: Anomalurus
        - Lord Derby's scaly-tailed squirrel, Anomalurus derbianus LC
        - Dwarf scaly-tailed squirrel, Anomalurus pusillus LC
      - Genus: Anomalurops
        - Beecroft's scaly-tailed squirrel, Anomalurops beecrofti LC
    - Subfamily: Zenkerellinae
      - Genus: Idiurus
        - Flying mouse, Idiurus zenkeri DD
  - Family: Sciuridae (squirrels)
    - Subfamily: Xerinae
      - Tribe: Xerini
        - Genus: Xerus
          - Striped ground squirrel, Xerus erythropus LC
          - Unstriped ground squirrel, Xerus rutilus LC
      - Tribe: Protoxerini
        - Genus: Funisciurus
          - Carruther's mountain squirrel, Funisciurus carruthersi LC
          - Fire-footed rope squirrel, Funisciurus pyrropus LC
        - Genus: Heliosciurus
          - Gambian sun squirrel, Heliosciurus gambianus LC
          - Red-legged sun squirrel, Heliosciurus rufobrachium LC
          - Ruwenzori sun squirrel, Heliosciurus ruwenzorii LC
        - Genus: Paraxerus
          - Alexander's bush squirrel, Paraxerus alexandri LC
          - Boehm's bush squirrel, Paraxerus boehmi LC
        - Genus: Protoxerus
          - Forest giant squirrel, Protoxerus stangeri LC
  - Family: Gliridae (dormice)
    - Subfamily: Graphiurinae
      - Genus: Graphiurus
        - Lorrain dormouse, Graphiurus lorraineus LC
        - Kellen's dormouse, Graphiurus kelleni LC
  - Family: Spalacidae
    - Subfamily: Tachyoryctinae
      - Genus: Tachyoryctes
        - Ankole African mole-rat, Tachyoryctes ankoliae
        - Rudd's African mole-rat, Tachyoryctes ruddi
  - Family: Nesomyidae
    - Subfamily: Delanymyinae
      - Genus: Delanymys
        - Delany's swamp mouse, Delanymys brooksi EN
    - Subfamily: Dendromurinae
      - Genus: Dendromus
        - Montane African climbing mouse, Dendromus insignis LC
        - Kivu climbing mouse, Dendromus kivu LC
        - Gray climbing mouse, Dendromus melanotis LC
        - Chestnut climbing mouse, Dendromus mystacalis LC
      - Genus: Steatomys
        - Tiny fat mouse, Steatomys parvus LC
    - Subfamily: Cricetomyinae
      - Genus: Cricetomys
        - Emin's pouched rat, Cricetomys emini LC
        - Gambian pouched rat, Cricetomys gambianus LC
      - Genus: Saccostomus
        - Mearns's pouched mouse, Saccostomus mearnsi LC
  - Family: Cricetidae
    - Subfamily: Lophiomyinae
      - Genus: Lophiomys
        - Maned rat, Lophiomys imhausi LC
  - Family: Muridae (mice, rats, voles, gerbils, hamsters, etc.)
    - Subfamily: Deomyinae
      - Genus: Acomys
        - Gray spiny mouse, Acomys cineraceus LC
        - Percival's spiny mouse, Acomys percivali LC
        - Wilson's spiny mouse, Acomys wilsoni LC
      - Genus: Deomys
        - Link rat, Deomys ferrugineus LC
      - Genus: Lophuromys
        - Rahm's brush-furred rat, Lophuromys rahmi NT
        - Rusty-bellied brush-furred rat, Lophuromys sikapusi LC
        - Woosnam's brush-furred rat, Lophuromys woosnami LC
      - Genus: Uranomys
        - Rudd's mouse, Uranomys ruddi LC
    - Subfamily: Otomyinae
      - Genus: Otomys
        - Barbour's vlei rat, Otomys barbouri EN
        - Ruwenzori vlei rat, Otomys dartmouthi VU
        - Dent's vlei rat, Otomys denti NT
        - Mount Elgon vlei rat, Otomys jacksoni EN
        - Tropical vlei rat, Otomys tropicalis LC
    - Subfamily: Gerbillinae
      - Genus: Gerbillus
        - Agag gerbil, Gerbillus agag DD
      - Genus: Tatera
        - Boehm's gerbil, Tatera boehmi LC
        - Kemp's gerbil, Tatera kempi LC
        - Bushveld gerbil, Tatera leucogaster LC
        - Fringe-tailed gerbil, Tatera robusta LC
        - Savanna gerbil, Tatera valida LC
      - Genus: Taterillus
        - Congo gerbil, Taterillus congicus LC
        - Emin's gerbil, Taterillus emini LC
        - Harrington's gerbil, Taterillus harringtoni LC
    - Subfamily: Murinae
      - Genus: Aethomys
        - Hinde's rock rat, Aethomys hindei LC
        - Kaiser's rock rat, Aethomys kaiseri LC
      - Genus: Arvicanthis
        - African grass rat, Arvicanthis niloticus LC
      - Genus: Colomys
        - African wading rat, Colomys goslingi LC
      - Genus: Dasymys
        - African marsh rat, Dasymys incomtus LC
        - Montane shaggy rat, Dasymys montanus VU
      - Genus: Grammomys
        - Forest thicket rat, Grammomys dryas NT
        - Ruwenzori thicket rat, Grammomys ibeanus LC
        - Macmillan's thicket rat, Grammomys macmillani LC
        - Shining thicket rat, Grammomys rutilans LC
      - Genus: Hybomys
        - Moon striped mouse, Hybomys lunaris VU
        - Peters's striped mouse, Hybomys univittatus LC
      - Genus: Hylomyscus
        - Beaded wood mouse, Hylomyscus aeta LC
        - Montane wood mouse, Hylomyscus denniae LC
        - Stella wood mouse, Hylomyscus stella LC
      - Genus: Lemniscomys
        - Buffoon striped grass mouse, Lemniscomys macculus LC
        - Typical striped grass mouse, Lemniscomys striatus LC
        - Heuglin's Lemniscomys, Lemniscomys zebra LC
      - Genus: Malacomys
        - Big-eared swamp rat, Malacomys longipes LC
      - Genus: Mastomys
        - Guinea multimammate mouse, Mastomys erythroleucus LC
        - Natal multimammate mouse, Mastomys natalensis LC
      - Genus: Mus
        - Toad mouse, Mus bufo LC
        - Mahomet mouse, Mus mahomet LC
        - African pygmy mouse, Mus minutoides LC
        - Peters's mouse, Mus setulosus LC
        - Thomas's pygmy mouse, Mus sorella LC
        - Gray-bellied pygmy mouse, Mus triton LC
      - Genus: Mylomys
        - African groove-toothed rat, Mylomys dybowskii LC
      - Genus: Myomyscus
        - Brockman's rock mouse, Myomyscus brockmani LC
      - Genus: Oenomys
        - Common rufous-nosed rat, Oenomys hypoxanthus LC
      - Genus: Pelomys
        - Creek groove-toothed swamp rat, Pelomys fallax LC
        - Hopkins's groove-toothed swamp rat, Pelomys hopkinsi VU
        - Issel's groove-toothed swamp rat, Pelomys isseli EN
      - Genus: Praomys
        - De Graaff's soft-furred mouse, Praomys degraaffi VU
        - Jackson's soft-furred mouse, Praomys jacksoni LC
        - Misonne's soft-furred mouse, Praomys misonnei LC
      - Genus: Rhabdomys
        - Four-striped grass mouse, Rhabdomys pumilio LC
      - Genus: Rattus
        - Black rat, Rattus rattus LC
      - Genus: Stochomys
        - Target rat, Stochomys longicaudatus LC
      - Genus: Thamnomys
        - Charming thicket rat, Thamnomys venustus NT
      - Genus: Zelotomys
        - Hildegarde's broad-headed mouse, Zelotomys hildegardeae LC

== Order: Lagomorpha (lagomorphs) ==
The lagomorphs comprise two families, Leporidae (hares and rabbits), and Ochotonidae (pikas). Though they can resemble rodents, and were classified as a superfamily in that order until the early 20th century, they have since been considered a separate order. They differ from rodents in a number of physical characteristics, such as having four incisors in the upper jaw rather than two.

- Family: Leporidae (rabbits, hares)
  - Genus: Poelagus
    - Bunyoro rabbit, Poelagus marjorita LR/lc
  - Genus: Lepus
    - Cape hare, Lepus capensis LR/lc
    - African savanna hare, Lepus microtis LR/lc

== Order: Erinaceomorpha (hedgehogs and gymnures) ==
The order Erinaceomorpha contains a single family, Erinaceidae, which comprise the hedgehogs and gymnures. The hedgehogs are easily recognised by their spines while gymnures look more like large rats.

- Family: Erinaceidae (hedgehogs)
  - Subfamily: Erinaceinae
    - Genus: Atelerix
      - Four-toed hedgehog, Atelerix albiventris LR/lc

== Order: Soricomorpha (shrews, moles, and solenodons) ==
The "shrew-forms" are insectivorous mammals. The shrews and solenodons closely resemble mice while the moles are stout-bodied burrowers.

- Family: Soricidae (shrews)
  - Subfamily: Crocidurinae
    - Genus: Crocidura
      - Congo shrew, Crocidura congobelgica LC
      - Dent's shrew, Crocidura denti LC
      - Long-tailed musk shrew, Crocidura dolichura LC
      - Savanna shrew, Crocidura fulvastra LC
      - Bicolored musk shrew, Crocidura fuscomurina LC
      - Jackson's shrew, Crocidura jacksoni LC
      - Butiaba naked-tailed shrew, Crocidura littoralis LC
      - Moonshine shrew, Crocidura luna LC
      - Dark shrew, Crocidura maurisca DD
      - Montane white-toothed shrew, Crocidura montis LC
      - Ugandan musk shrew, Crocidura mutesae DD
      - Savanna dwarf shrew, Crocidura nanilla LC
      - African black shrew, Crocidura nigrofusca LC
      - Niobe's shrew, Crocidura niobe LC
      - African giant shrew, Crocidura olivieri LC
      - Small-footed shrew, Crocidura parvipes LC
      - Flat-headed shrew, Crocidura planiceps DD
      - Roosevelt's shrew, Crocidura roosevelti LC
      - Ugandan lowland shrew, Crocidura selina LC
      - Lesser gray-brown musk shrew, Crocidura silacea LC
      - Kahuzi swamp shrew, Crocidura stenocephala VU
      - Tarella shrew, Crocidura tarella VU
      - Turbo shrew, Crocidura turba LC
      - Savanna path shrew, Crocidura viaria LC
    - Genus: Paracrocidura
      - Greater large-headed shrew, Paracrocidura maxima NT
    - Genus: Ruwenzorisorex
      - Ruwenzori shrew, Ruwenzorisorex suncoides VU
    - Genus: Scutisorex
      - Armored shrew, Scutisorex somereni LC
    - Genus: Suncus
      - Least dwarf shrew, Suncus infinitesimus LC
    - Genus: Sylvisorex
      - Grant's forest shrew, Sylvisorex granti LC
      - Johnston's forest shrew, Sylvisorex johnstoni LC
      - Moon forest shrew, Sylvisorex lunaris LC
      - Climbing shrew, Sylvisorex megalura LC
      - Volcano shrew, Sylvisorex vulcanorum LC
  - Subfamily: Myosoricinae
    - Genus: Myosorex
      - Babault's mouse shrew, Myosorex babaulti VU
      - Montane mouse shrew, Myosorex blarina VU

== Order: Chiroptera (bats) ==
The bats' most distinguishing feature is that their forelimbs are developed as wings, making them the only mammals capable of flight. Bat species account for about 20% of all mammals.

- Family: Pteropodidae (flying foxes, Old World fruit bats)
  - Subfamily: Pteropodinae
    - Genus: Eidolon
      - Straw-coloured fruit bat, Eidolon helvum LC
    - Genus: Epomophorus
      - Ethiopian epauletted fruit bat, Epomophorus labiatus LC
      - East African epauletted fruit bat, Epomophorus minimus LC
      - Wahlberg's epauletted fruit bat, Epomophorus wahlbergi LC
    - Genus: Epomops
      - Franquet's epauletted fruit bat, Epomops franqueti LC
    - Genus: Hypsignathus
      - Hammer-headed bat, Hypsignathus monstrosus LC
    - Genus: Lissonycteris
      - Angolan rousette, Lissonycteris angolensis LC
    - Genus: Micropteropus
      - Peters's dwarf epauletted fruit bat, Micropteropus pusillus LC
    - Genus: Myonycteris
      - Little collared fruit bat, Myonycteris torquata LC
    - Genus: Rousettus
      - Egyptian fruit bat, Rousettus aegyptiacus LC
    - Genus: Stenonycteris
      - Long-haired rousette, Stenonycteris lanosus LC
  - Subfamily: Macroglossinae
    - Genus: Megaloglossus
      - Woermann's bat, Megaloglossus woermanni LC
- Family: Vespertilionidae
  - Subfamily: Kerivoulinae
    - Genus: Kerivoula
      - Damara woolly bat, Kerivoula argentata LC
      - Spurrell's woolly bat, Kerivoula phalaena NT
      - Smith's woolly bat, Kerivoula smithi LC
  - Subfamily: Myotinae
    - Genus: Myotis
      - Rufous mouse-eared bat, Myotis bocagii LC
      - Welwitsch's bat, Myotis welwitschii LC
  - Subfamily: Vespertilioninae
    - Genus: Glauconycteris
      - Bibundi bat, Glauconycteris egeria DD
      - Glen's wattled bat, Glauconycteris gleni VU
      - Allen's spotted bat, Glauconycteris humeralis DD
      - Butterfly bat, Glauconycteris variegata LC
    - Genus: Hypsugo
      - Broad-headed pipistrelle, Hypsugo crassulus LC
      - Eisentraut's pipistrelle, Hypsugo eisentrauti DD
    - Genus: Mimetillus
      - Moloney's mimic bat, Mimetillus moloneyi LC
    - Genus: Neoromicia
      - Cape serotine, Neoromicia capensis LC
      - Tiny serotine, Neoromicia guineensis LC
      - Heller's pipistrelle, Neoromicia helios DD
      - Banana pipistrelle, Neoromicia nanus LC
      - Rendall's serotine, Neoromicia rendalli LC
      - Somali serotine, Neoromicia somalicus LC
      - White-winged serotine, Neoromicia tenuipinnis LC
      - Zulu serotine, Neoromicia zuluensis LC
    - Genus: Pipistrellus
      - Tiny pipistrelle, Pipistrellus nanulus LC
      - Rüppell's pipistrelle, Pipistrellus rueppelli LC
      - Rusty pipistrelle, Pipistrellus rusticus LC
    - Genus: Scotoecus
      - White-bellied lesser house bat, Scotoecus albigula DD
      - Light-winged lesser house bat, Scotoecus albofuscus DD
      - Dark-winged lesser house bat, Scotoecus hirundo DD
    - Genus: Scotophilus
      - African yellow bat, Scotophilus dinganii LC
      - White-bellied yellow bat, Scotophilus leucogaster LC
      - Robbins's yellow bat, Scotophilus nucella VU
      - Nut-colored yellow bat, Scotophilus nux LC
  - Subfamily: Miniopterinae
    - Genus: Miniopterus
      - Lesser long-fingered bat, Miniopterus fraterculus LC
      - Greater long-fingered bat, Miniopterus inflatus LC
      - Natal long-fingered bat, Miniopterus natalensis NT
- Family: Rhinopomatidae
  - Genus: Rhinopoma
    - Macinnes's mouse-tailed bat, Rhinopoma macinnesi VU
- Family: Molossidae
  - Genus: Chaerephon
    - Duke of Abruzzi's free-tailed bat, Chaerephon aloysiisabaudiae NT
    - Gland-tailed free-tailed bat, Chaerephon bemmeleni LC
    - Spotted free-tailed bat, Chaerephon bivittata LC
    - Chapin's free-tailed bat, Chaerephon chapini DD
    - Lappet-eared free-tailed bat, Chaerephon major LC
    - Nigerian free-tailed bat, Chaerephon nigeriae LC
    - Little free-tailed bat, Chaerephon pumila LC
  - Genus: Mops
    - Angolan free-tailed bat, Mops condylurus LC
    - Medje free-tailed bat, Mops congicus NT
    - Mongalla free-tailed bat, Mops demonstrator NT
    - Midas free-tailed bat, Mops midas LC
    - Dwarf free-tailed bat, Mops nanulus LC
    - Railer bat, Mops thersites LC
    - Trevor's free-tailed bat, Mops trevori VU
  - Genus: Myopterus
    - Bini free-tailed bat, Myopterus whitleyi LC
  - Genus: Otomops
    - Large-eared free-tailed bat, Otomops martiensseni NT
  - Genus: Tadarida
    - Egyptian free-tailed bat, Tadarida aegyptiaca LC
- Family: Emballonuridae
  - Genus: Coleura
    - African sheath-tailed bat, Coleura afra LC
  - Genus: Saccolaimus
    - Pel's pouched bat, Saccolaimus peli NT
  - Genus: Taphozous
    - Hamilton's tomb bat, Taphozous hamiltoni NT
    - Mauritian tomb bat, Taphozous mauritianus LC
    - Egyptian tomb bat, Taphozous perforatus LC
- Family: Nycteridae
  - Genus: Nycteris
    - Bate's slit-faced bat, Nycteris arge LC
    - Andersen's slit-faced bat, Nycteris aurita DD
    - Hairy slit-faced bat, Nycteris hispida LC
    - Large-eared slit-faced bat, Nycteris macrotis LC
    - Dwarf slit-faced bat, Nycteris nana LC
    - Egyptian slit-faced bat, Nycteris thebaica LC
- Family: Megadermatidae
  - Genus: Cardioderma
    - Heart-nosed bat, Cardioderma cor LC
  - Genus: Lavia
    - Yellow-winged bat, Lavia frons LC
- Family: Rhinolophidae
  - Subfamily: Rhinolophinae
    - Genus: Rhinolophus
      - Halcyon horseshoe bat, Rhinolophus alcyone LC
      - Geoffroy's horseshoe bat, Rhinolophus clivosus LC
      - Eloquent horseshoe bat, Rhinolophus eloquens DD
      - Rüppell's horseshoe bat, Rhinolophus fumigatus LC
      - Hildebrandt's horseshoe bat, Rhinolophus hildebrandti LC
      - Lander's horseshoe bat, Rhinolophus landeri LC
      - Ruwenzori horseshoe bat, Rhinolophus ruwenzorii VU
  - Subfamily: Hipposiderinae
    - Genus: Hipposideros
      - Aba roundleaf bat, Hipposideros abae NT
      - Sundevall's roundleaf bat, Hipposideros caffer LC
      - Cyclops roundleaf bat, Hipposideros cyclops LC
      - Sooty roundleaf bat, Hipposideros fuliginosus NT
      - Noack's roundleaf bat, Hipposideros ruber LC
    - Genus: Triaenops
      - Persian trident bat, Triaenops persicus LC

== Order: Pholidota (pangolins) ==
The order Pholidota comprises the eight species of pangolin. Pangolins are anteaters and have the powerful claws, elongated snout and long tongue seen in the other unrelated anteater species.

- Family: Manidae
  - Genus: Manis
    - Giant pangolin, Manis gigantea LR/lc
    - Ground pangolin, Manis temminckii LR/nt
    - Long-tailed pangolin, Manis tetradactyla LR/lc
    - Tree pangolin, Manis tricuspis LR/lc

== Order: Carnivora (carnivorans) ==
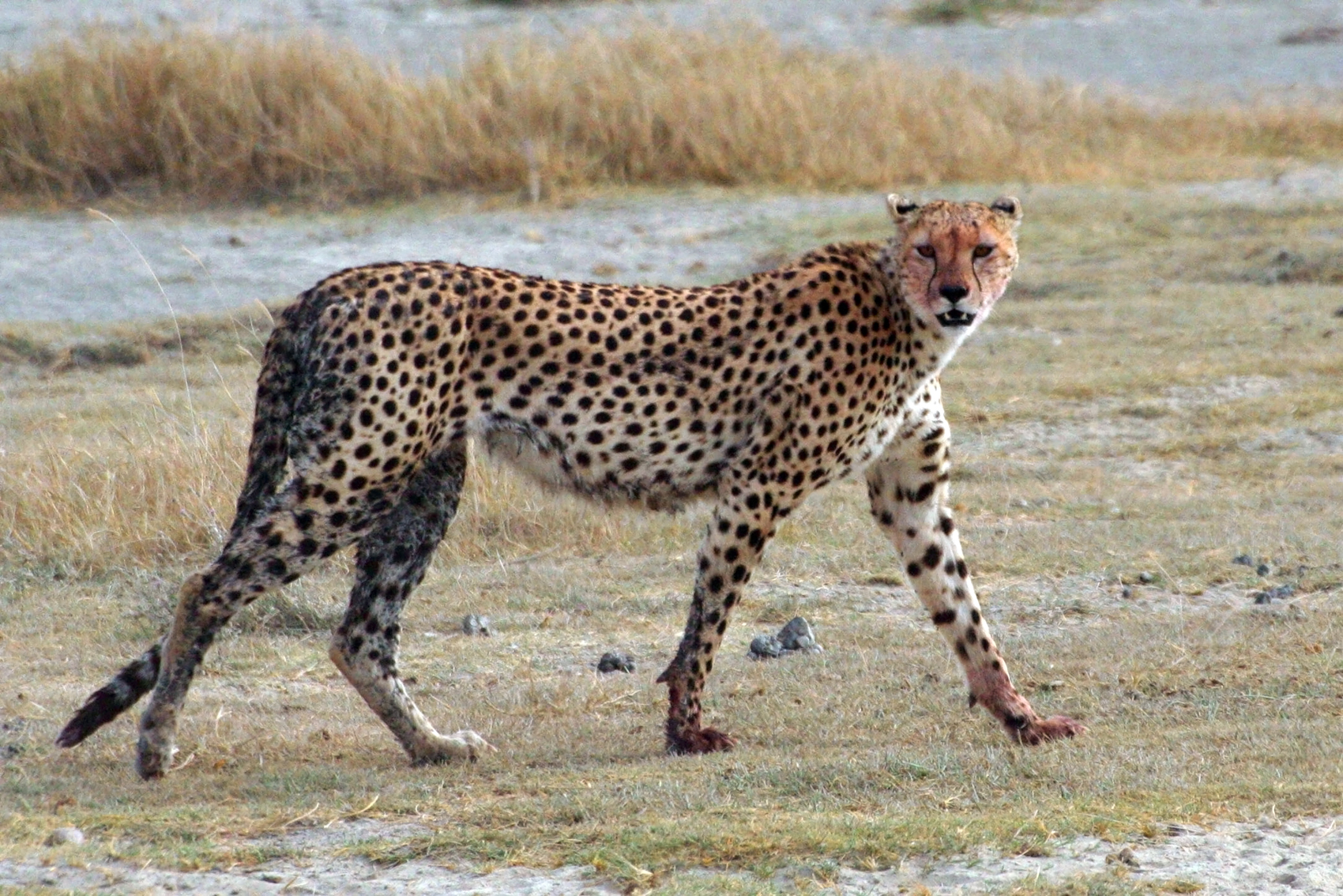
Cheetah

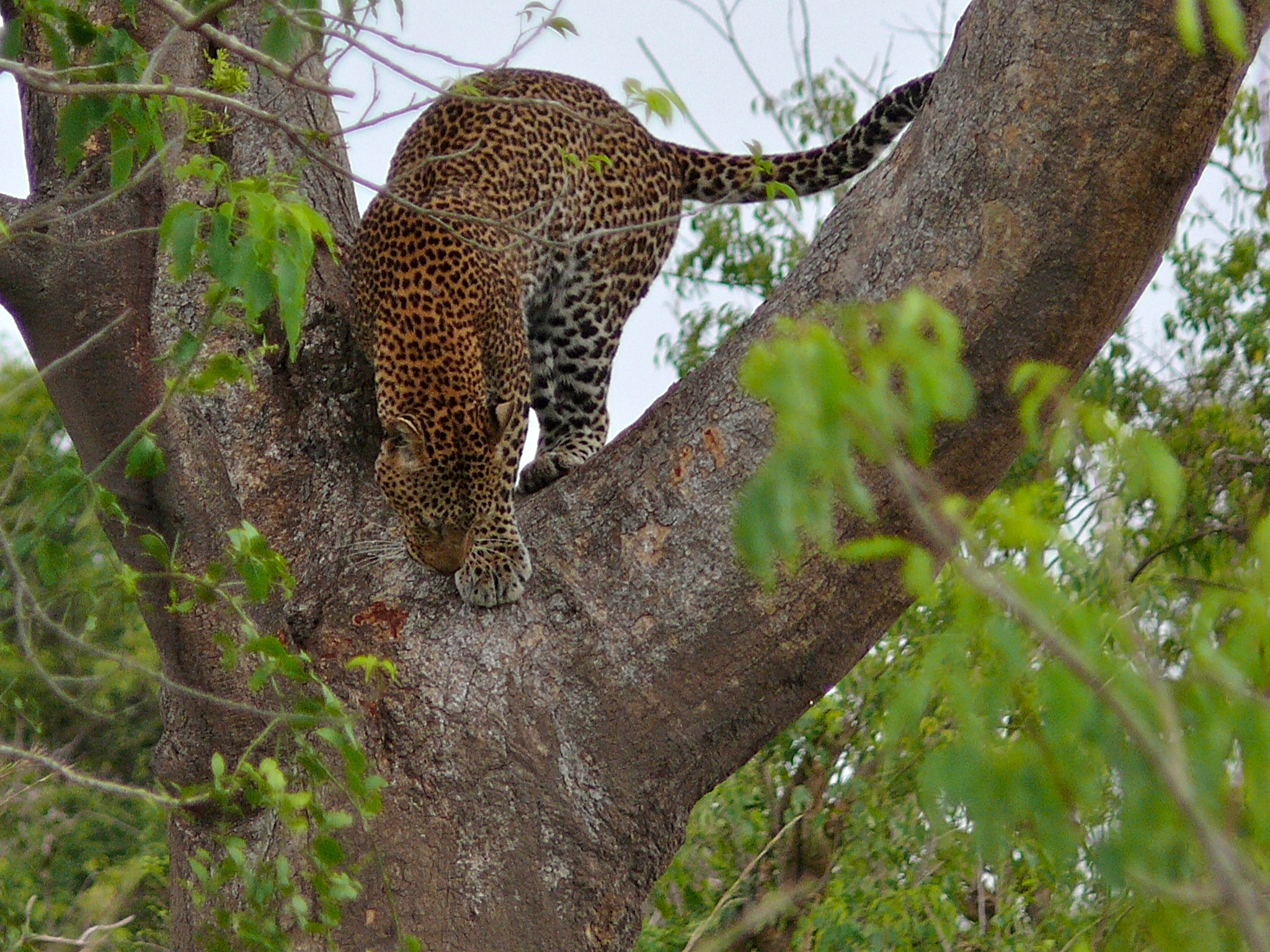
African leopard

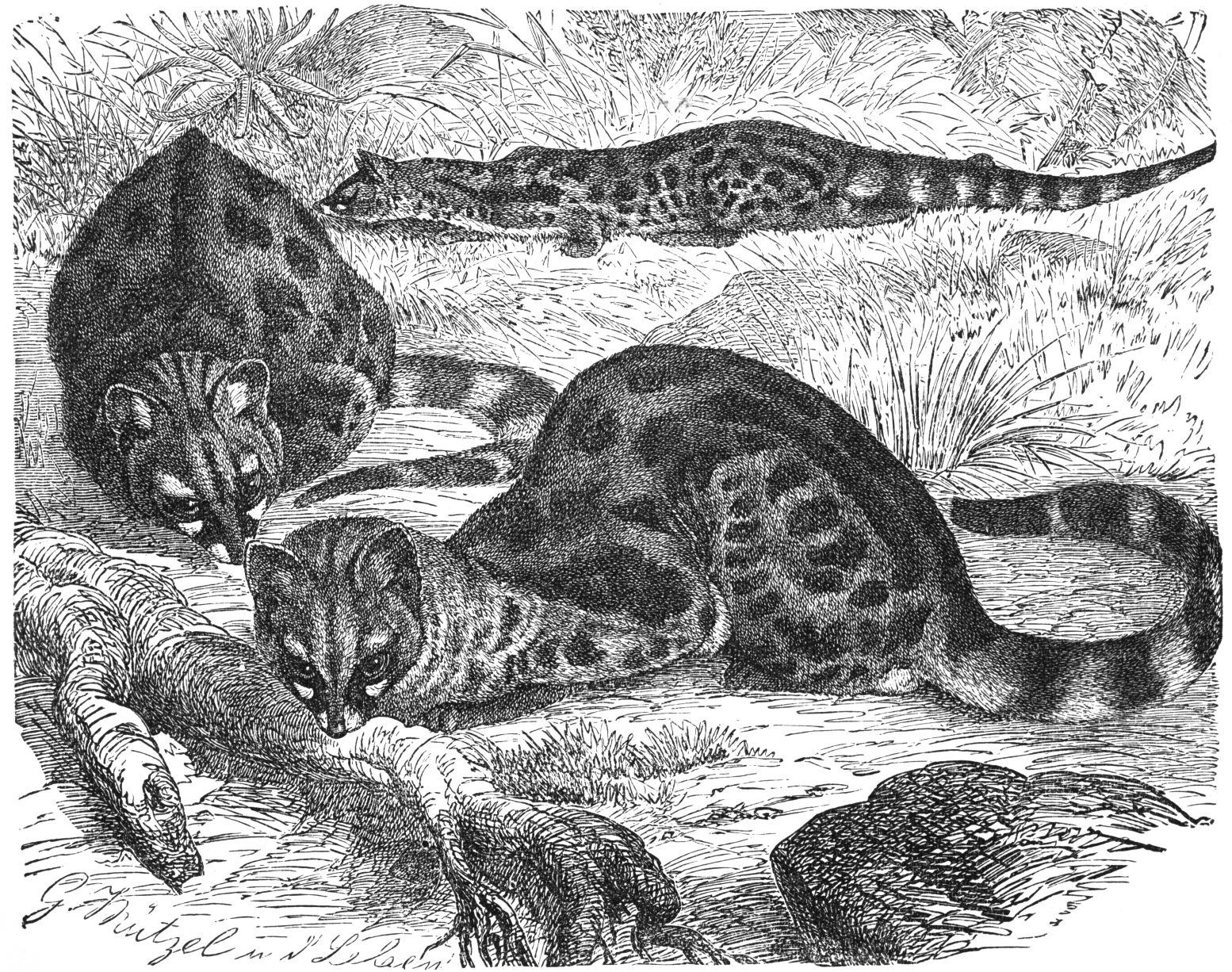
Common genet

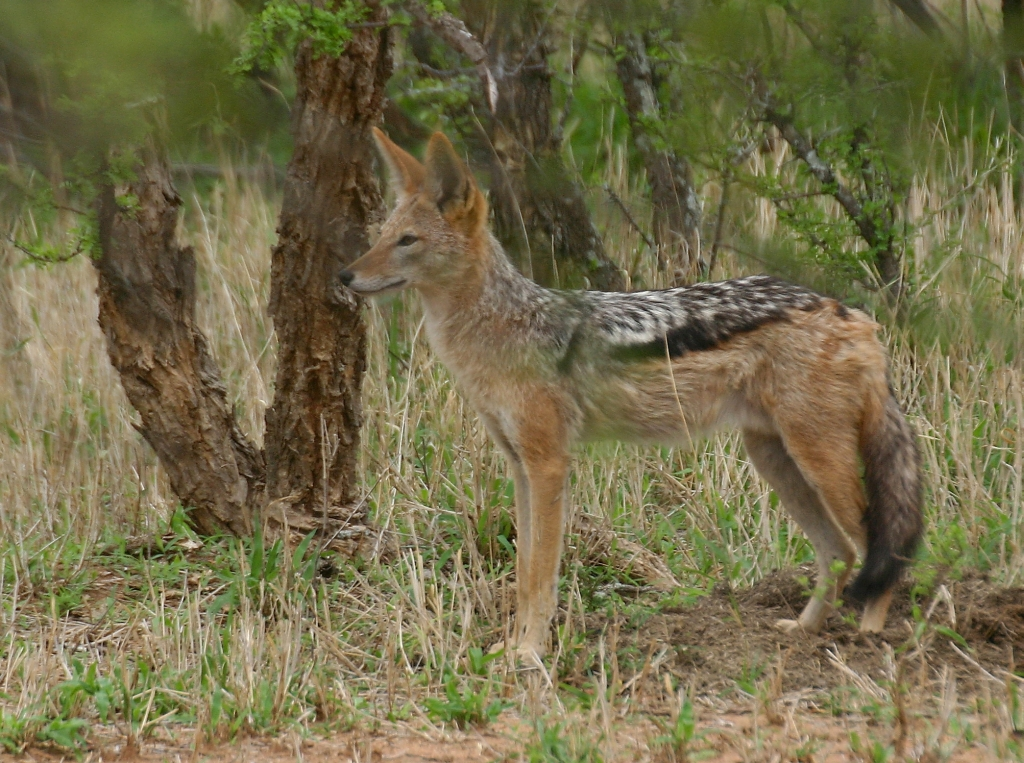
Black-backed jackal

There are over 260 species of carnivorans, the majority of which eat meat as their primary dietary item. They have a characteristic skull shape and dentition.

- Suborder: Feliformia
  - Family: Felidae (cats)
    - Subfamily: Felinae
      - Genus: Acinonyx
        - Cheetah, A. jubatus VU
      - Genus: Caracal
        - Caracal, C. caracal LC
        - African golden cat, C. aurata VU
      - Genus: Felis
        - African wildcat, F. lybica LC
      - Genus: Leptailurus
        - Serval, Leptailurus serval LC
    - Subfamily: Pantherinae
      - Genus: Panthera
        - Lion, Panthera leo VU
        - Leopard, Panthera pardus VU
          - African leopard, Panthera pardus pardus
  - Family: Viverridae
    - Subfamily: Viverrinae
      - Genus: Civettictis
        - African civet, C. civetta LC
      - Genus: Genetta
        - Common genet, Genetta genetta LC
        - Rusty-spotted genet, Genetta maculata LC
        - Servaline genet, Genetta servalina LC
  - Family: Nandiniidae
    - Genus: Nandinia
      - African palm civet, Nandinia binotata LC
  - Family: Herpestidae (mongooses)
    - Genus: Atilax
      - Marsh mongoose, Atilax paludinosus LC
    - Genus: Bdeogale
      - Jackson's mongoose, Bdeogale jacksoni NT
    - Genus: Crossarchus
      - Alexander's kusimanse, Crossarchus alexandri LC
    - Genus: Dologale
      - Pousargues's mongoose, Dologale dybowskii DD
    - Genus: Helogale
      - Common dwarf mongoose, Helogale parvula LC
    - Genus: Herpestes
      - Egyptian mongoose, Herpestes ichneumon LC
      - Common slender mongoose, Herpestes sanguineus LC
    - Genus: Mungos
      - Banded mongoose, Mungos mungo LC
  - Family: Hyaenidae (hyaenas)
    - Genus: Crocuta
      - Spotted hyena, Crocuta crocuta LC
    - Genus: Proteles
      - Aardwolf, Proteles cristatus LC
- Suborder: Caniformia
  - Family: Canidae (dogs, foxes)
    - Genus: Lupulella
      - Side-striped jackal, L. adusta LC
      - Black-backed jackal, L. mesomelas LC
    - Genus: Lycaon
      - African wild dog, L. pictus EN possibly extirpated
  - Family: Mustelidae (mustelids)
    - Genus: Ictonyx
      - Striped polecat, I. striatus LC
    - Genus: Poecilogale
      - African striped weasel, Poecilogale albinucha LC
    - Genus: Mellivora
      - Honey badger, M. capensis LC
    - Genus: Lutra
      - Spotted-necked otter, H. maculicollis NT
    - Genus: Aonyx
      - African clawless otter, A. capensis NT

== Order: Perissodactyla (odd-toed ungulates) ==
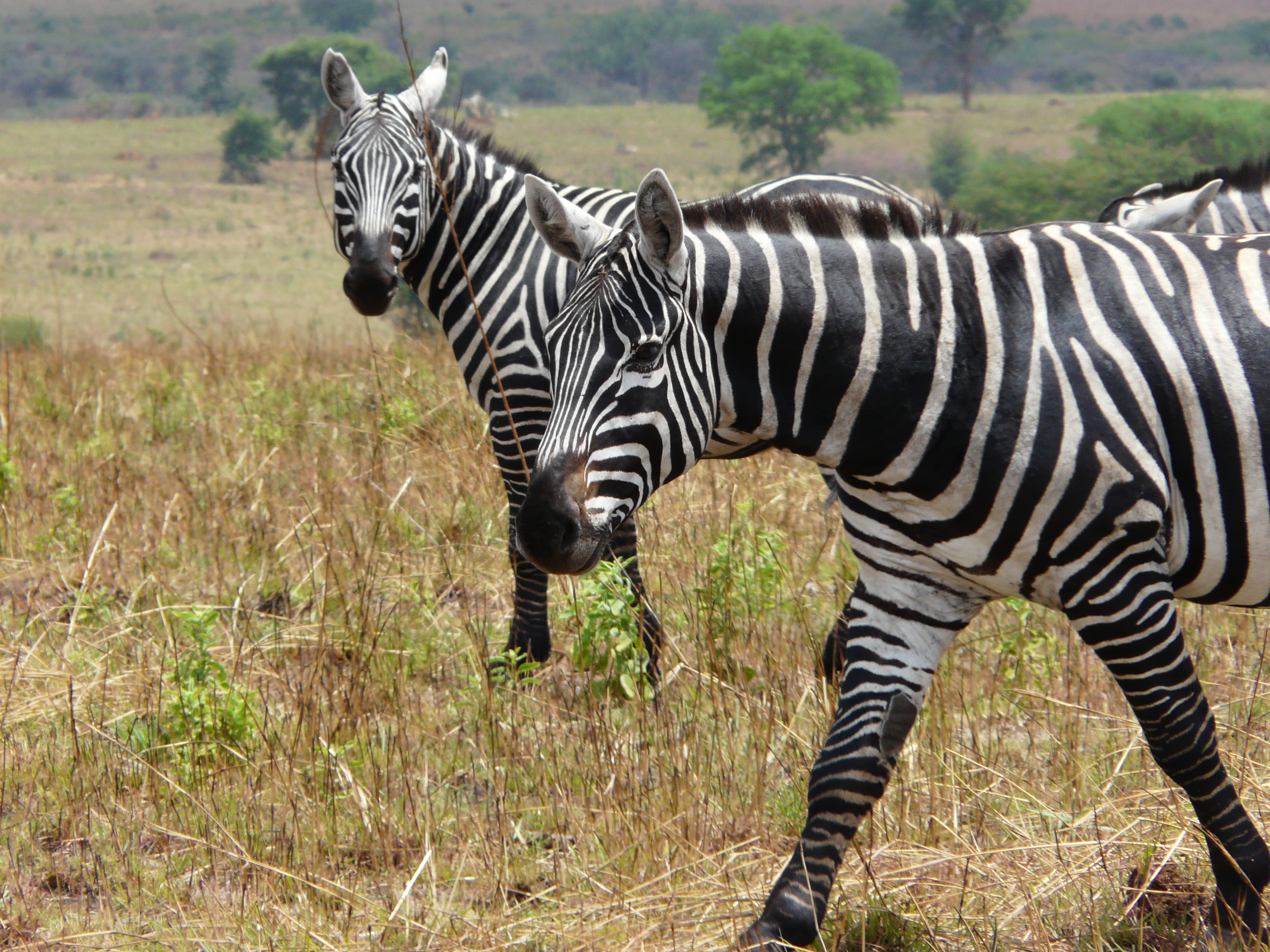
Maneless zebra

The odd-toed ungulates are browsing and grazing mammals. They are usually large to very large, and have relatively simple stomachs and a large middle toe.

- Family: Equidae (horses etc.)
  - Genus: Equus
    - Plains zebra, Equus quagga NT
      - Maneless zebra, Equus quagga borensis
- Family: Rhinocerotidae
  - Genus: Ceratotherium
    - White rhinoceros, Ceratotherium simum NT
      - Northern white rhinoceros, Ceratotherium s. cottoni CR extirpated
      - Southern white rhinoceros, C. s. simum NT reintroduced
  - Genus: Diceros
    - Black rhinoceros, Diceros bicornis CR extirpated
      - Eastern black rhinoceros, Diceros bicornis michaeli CR extirpated

== Order: Artiodactyla (even-toed ungulates) ==
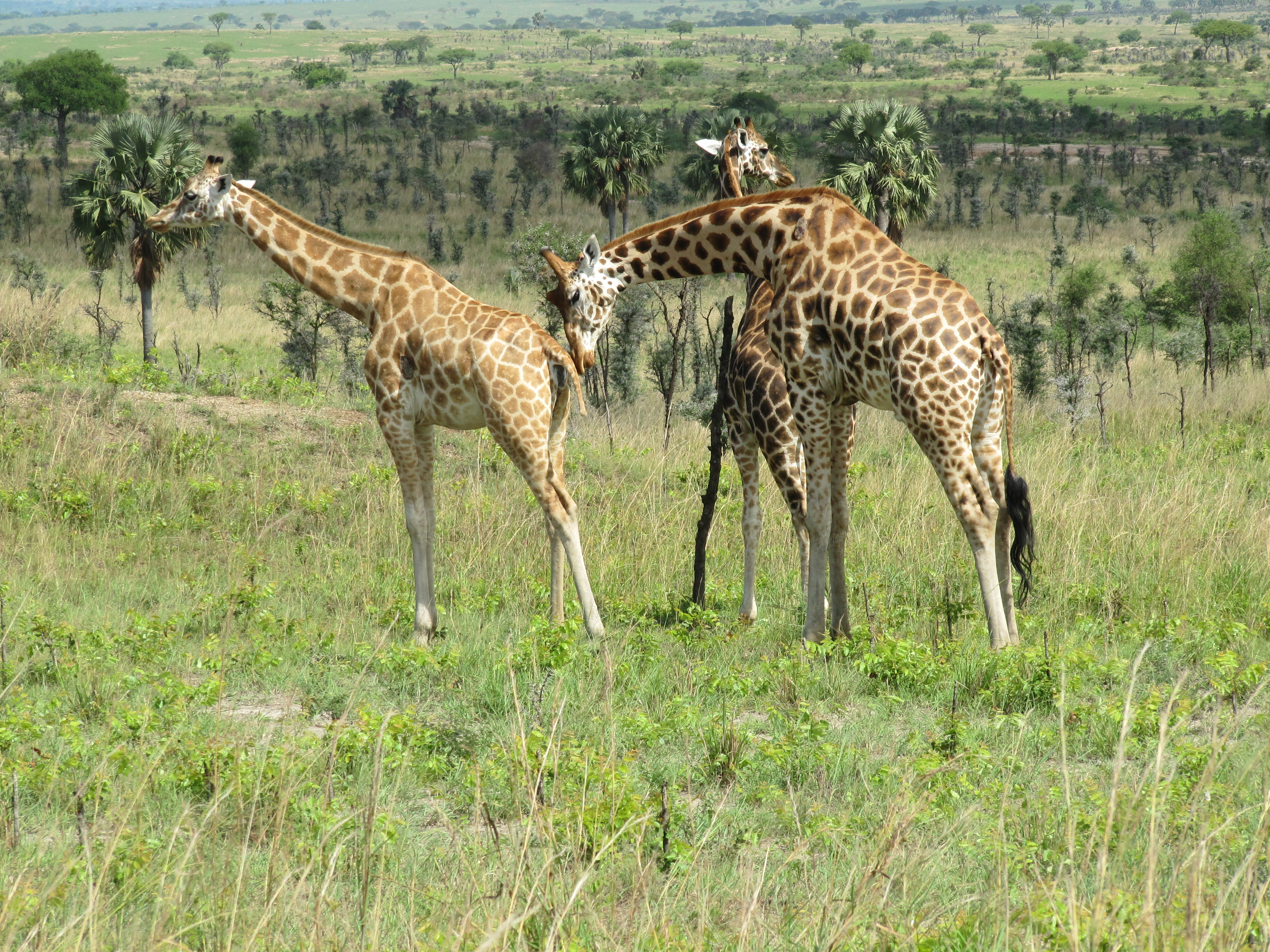
Rothschild's giraffe

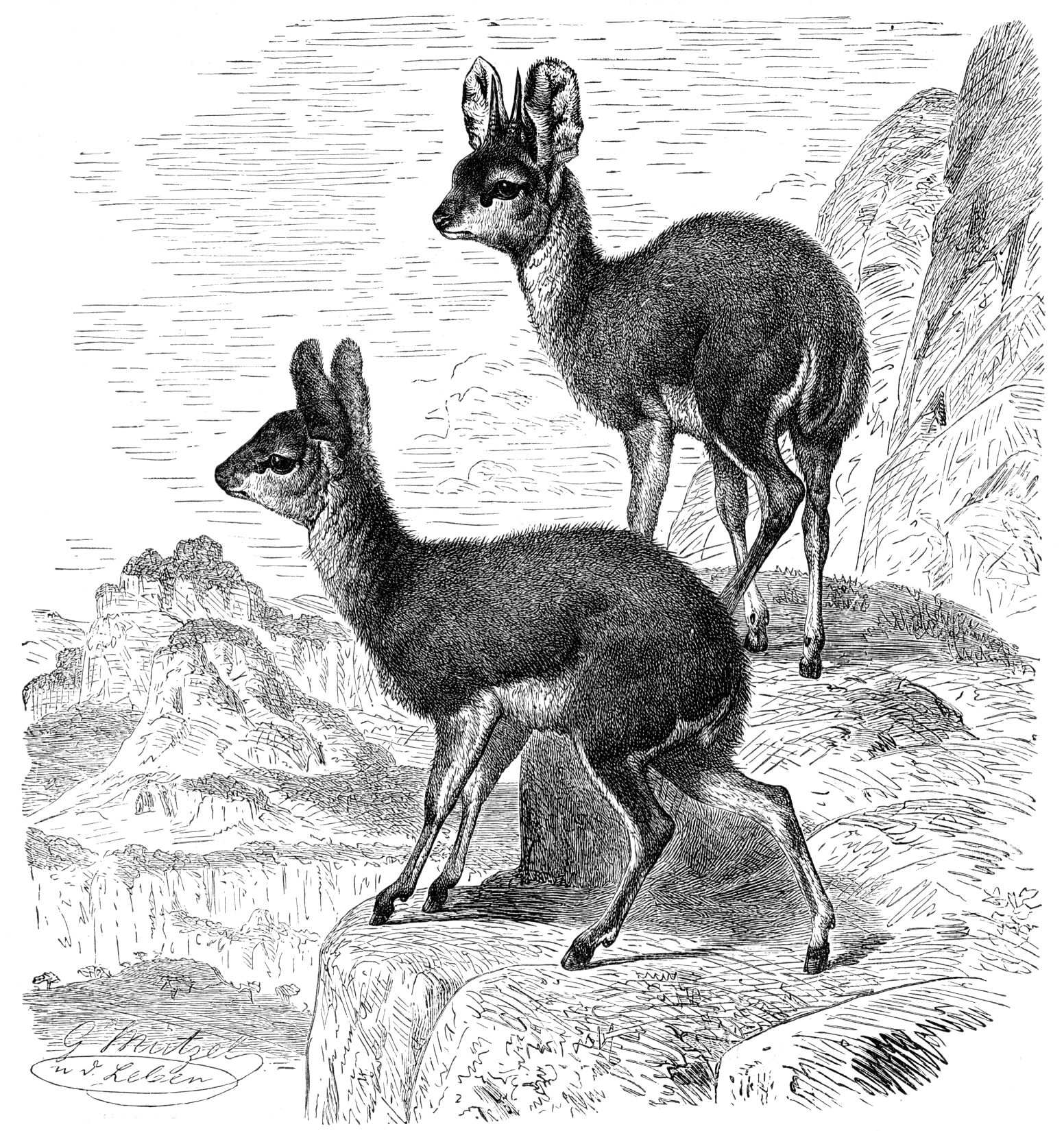
Klipspringer

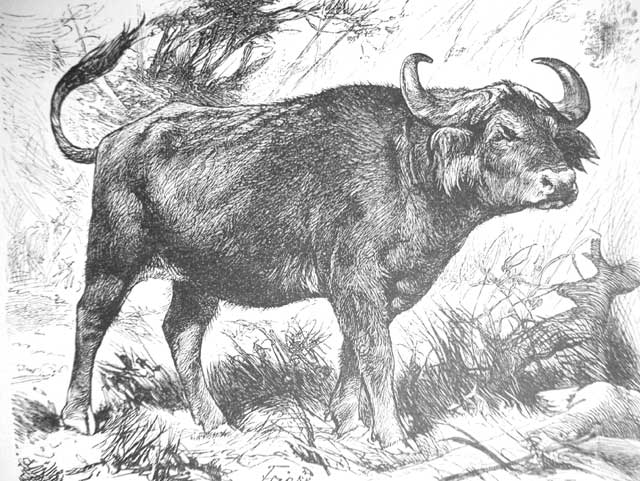
African buffalo

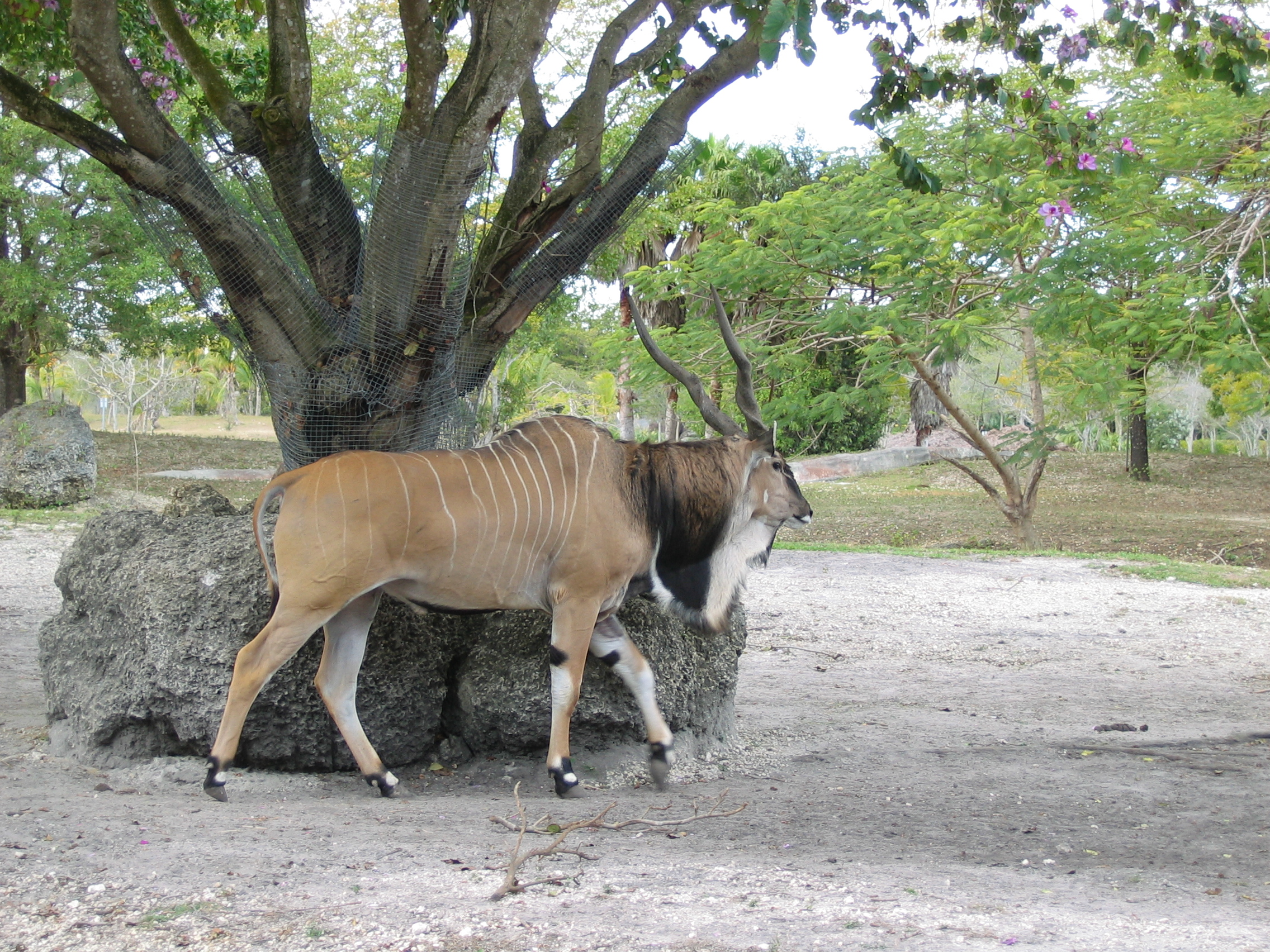
Giant eland

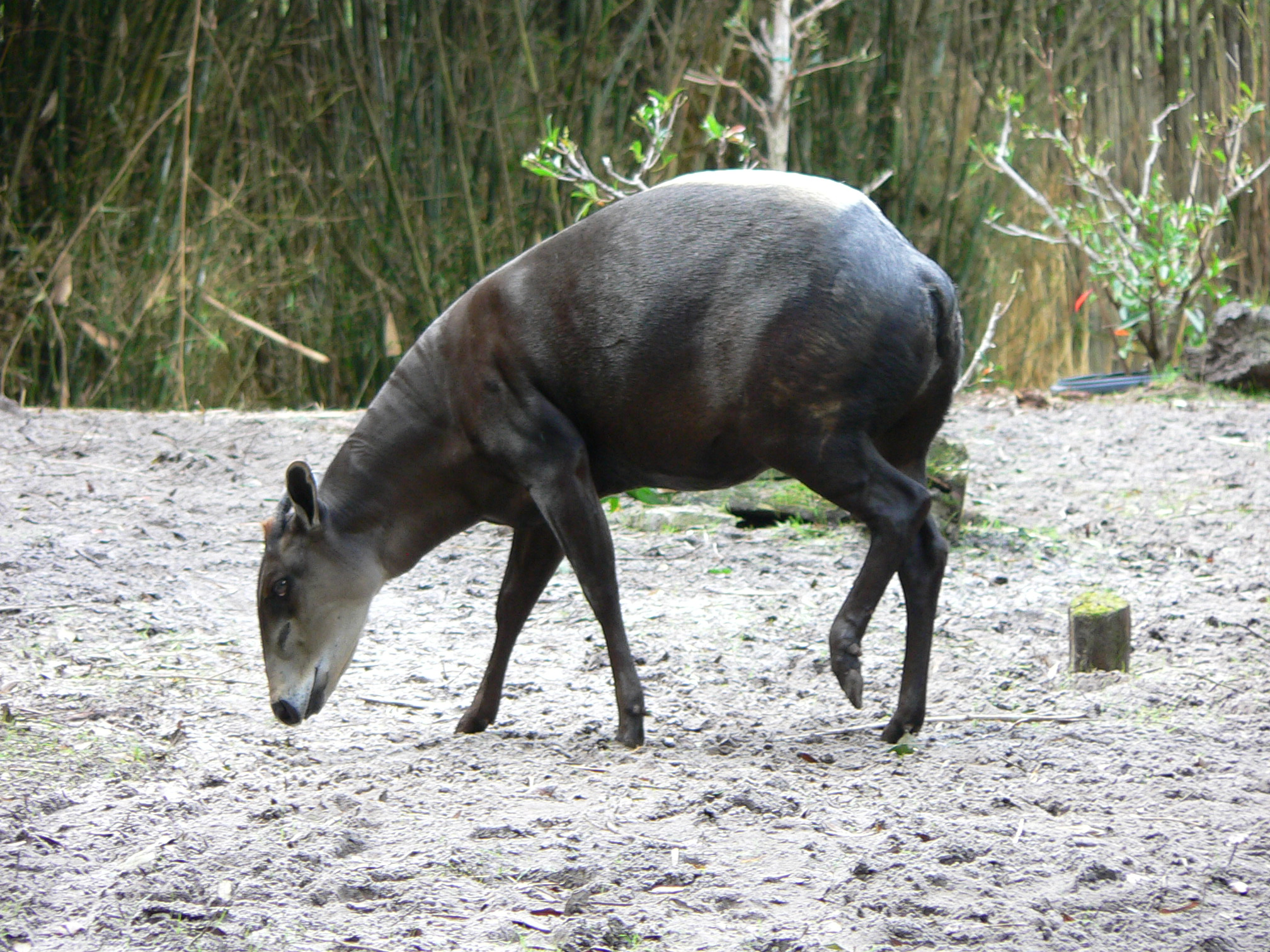
Yellow-backed duiker

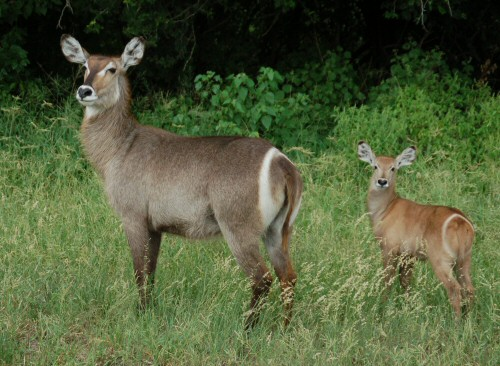
Waterbuck

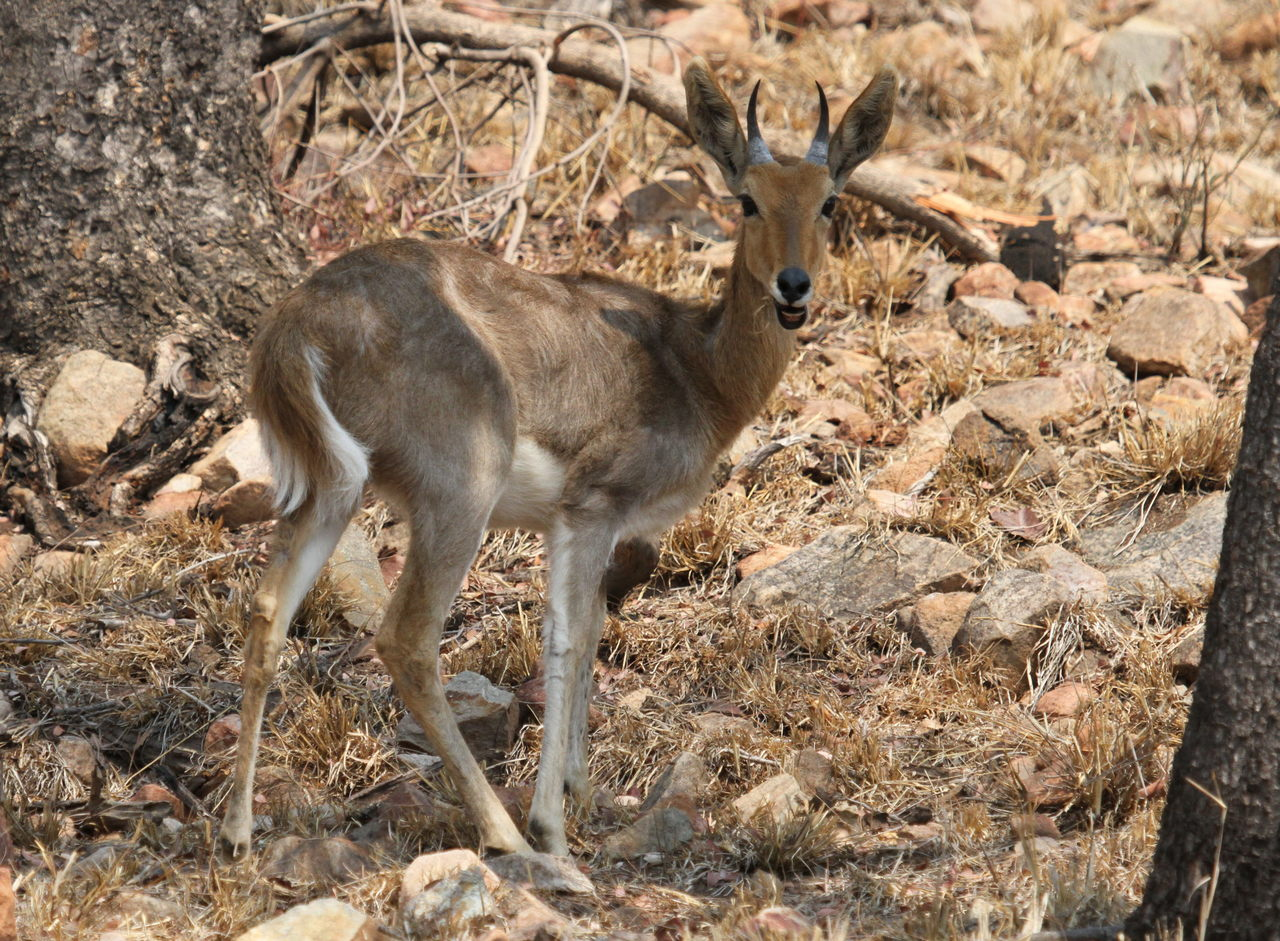
Mountain reedbuck

The even-toed ungulates are ungulates whose weight is borne about equally by the third and fourth toes, rather than mostly or entirely by the third as in perissodactyls. There are about 220 artiodactyl species, including many that are of great economic importance to humans.

- Family: Suidae (pigs)
  - Subfamily: Phacochoerinae
    - Genus: Phacochoerus
      - Common warthog, Phacochoerus africanus
  - Subfamily: Suinae
    - Genus: Hylochoerus
      - Giant forest hog, Hylochoerus meinertzhageni LR/lc
    - Genus: Potamochoerus
      - Bushpig, Potamochoerus larvatus LR/lc
      - Red river hog, Potamochoerus porcus LR/lc
- Family: Hippopotamidae (hippopotamuses)
  - Genus: Hippopotamus
    - Hippopotamus, Hippopotamus amphibius VU
- Family: Tragulidae
  - Genus: Hyemoschus
    - Water chevrotain, Hyemoschus aquaticus DD
- Family: Giraffidae (giraffe, okapi)
  - Genus: Giraffa
    - Giraffe, Giraffa camelopardalis VU
  - Genus: Okapia
    - Okapi, Okapia johnstoni EN extirpated
- Family: Bovidae (cattle, antelope, sheep, goats)
  - Subfamily: Alcelaphinae
    - Genus: Alcelaphus
      - Hartebeest, Alcelaphus buselaphus LR/cd
    - Genus: Damaliscus
      - Topi, Damaliscus lunatus LR/cd
  - Subfamily: Antilopinae
    - Genus: Gazella
      - Grant's gazelle, Gazella granti LR/cd
    - Genus: Madoqua
      - Günther's dik-dik, Madoqua guentheri LR/lc
    - Genus: Neotragus
      - Bates's pygmy antelope, Neotragus batesi LR/nt
    - Genus: Oreotragus
      - Klipspringer, Oreotragus oreotragus LR/cd
    - Genus: Ourebia
      - Oribi, Ourebia ourebi LR/cd
    - Genus: Raphicerus
      - Steenbok, Raphicerus campestris LR/lc
  - Subfamily: Bovinae
    - Genus: Syncerus
      - African buffalo, S. caffer NT
    - Genus: Tragelaphus
      - Giant eland, Tragelaphus derbianus NT possibly extirpated
      - Bongo, Tragelaphus eurycerus LR/nt extirpated
      - Lesser kudu, Tragelaphus imberbis LR/cd
      - Common eland, Tragelaphus oryx LR/cd
      - Bushbuck, Tragelaphus scriptus LR/lc
      - Sitatunga, Tragelaphus spekii LR/nt
      - Greater kudu, Tragelaphus strepsiceros LR/cd
  - Subfamily: Cephalophinae
    - Genus: Cephalophus
      - Peters's duiker, Cephalophus callipygus LR/nt
      - Bay duiker, Cephalophus dorsalis LR/nt
      - Blue duiker, Cephalophus monticola LR/lc
      - Black-fronted duiker, Cephalophus nigrifrons LR/nt
      - Red-flanked duiker, Cephalophus rufilatus LR/cd
      - Yellow-backed duiker, Cephalophus silvicultor LR/nt
      - Weyns's duiker, Cephalophus weynsi LR/nt
    - Genus: Sylvicapra
      - Common duiker, Sylvicapra grimmia LR/lc
  - Subfamily: Hippotraginae
    - Genus: Hippotragus
      - Roan antelope, Hippotragus equinus LR/cd
    - Genus: Oryx
      - East African oryx, Oryx beisa EN possibly extirpated
  - Subfamily: Aepycerotinae
    - Genus: Aepyceros
      - Impala, Aepyceros melampus LR/cd
  - Subfamily: Reduncinae
    - Genus: Kobus
      - Waterbuck, Kobus ellipsiprymnus LR/cd
      - Kob, Kobus kob LR/cd
    - Genus: Redunca
      - Mountain reedbuck, Redunca fulvorufula LC
      - Bohor reedbuck, Redunca redunca

== See also ==
- List of chordate orders
- Lists of mammals by region
- List of prehistoric mammals
- Mammal classification
- List of mammals described in the 2000s
