= Eastern rainforest grammomys =

Conservation status
- Least Concern (IUCN 3.1)

Scientific classification
- Kingdom: Animalia
- Phylum: Chordata
- Class: Mammalia
- Order: Rodentia
- Family: Muridae
- Genus: Grammomys
- Species: G. kuru

Binomial name
- Grammomys kuru Thomas & Wroughton, 1907

Synonyms
- G. poensis (Eisentraut, 1965) (disputed); G. rutilans (Peters, 1876) (disputed); G. centralis (Dollman, 1914)

Species of rodent

The eastern rainforest grammomys (Grammomys kuru), also known as the eastern rainforest thicket rat, is a species of rodent from the family Muridae.

The eastern rainforest grammomys is distributed in the Congo Basin in the Central African Republic, Democratic Republic of the Congo, the forest patches of western Uganda, and possibly the Republic of Congo. The species is found in moist and semi-dry montane and lowland rainforest.

The eastern rainforest grammomys is listed as a Least Concern species by the IUCN Red List due to its being presumed a common species. There are no apparent major threats to the species as a whole and there are no conservation measures in place; it is assumed that the eastern rainforest grammomys is present in various protected areas. It is unknown, however, if the species can persist in a modified or degraded habitat.

The eastern rainforest grammomys is considered by some to be a synonym of the shining thicket rat, but the eastern rainforest grammomys has a shorter skull and smaller molar rows.

== See also ==
- Shining thicket rat
