= Giant thicket rat =

Conservation status
- Endangered (IUCN 3.1)

Scientific classification
- Kingdom: Animalia
- Phylum: Chordata
- Class: Mammalia
- Order: Rodentia
- Family: Muridae
- Genus: Grammomys
- Species: G. gigas

Binomial name
- Grammomys gigas (Dollman, 1911)

Species of rodent

The giant thicket rat (Grammomys gigas) is a species of rodent in the family Muridae which is restricted to a small area of Kenya.

== Description ==
The giant thicket rat is a slender arboreal rat with large, ovoid ears with a rather long and fine coat. It is very similar to Grammomys ibeanus but has larger teeth, longer rear feet and a larger head. The head-body length is 132 mm (5.2 in), tail length 201 mm (7.9 in), the rear foot has a length of 26.5 mm (1.0 in), the ear is 19 mm (0.7 in) long and skull 35.1 mm (1.4 in).

== Distribution ==
The giant thicket rat is endemic to Kenya, where it is restricted to the vicinity of Mount Kenya.

== Habitat and ecology ==
The giant thicket rat is an arboreal species which is found in montane moist forest and high-elevation scrub. Species of the genus Grammomys feed on fruit, seeds and other plant matter, they occasionally eat arthropods.

== Conservation ==
The giant thicket rat is losing habitat due to the clearance of forest for timber, firewood and conversion to agricultural land. There is almost no data on how common the species is and, although there is no data on trends, it is thought that the population is decreasing. Much of the giant thicket rat's range lies within Mount Kenya National Park but it is a priority to establish other protected areas for this species. The giant thicket rat is classified as endangered because its range is less than 2,000 km^{2} (770 sq mi) and is in a single locality where the habitat is being degraded. As this species is so little known the International Union for Conservation of Nature and Natural Resources recommends that it needs further study to evaluate its status and ensure its conservation.
