= Desmomys =

Scientific classification
- Domain: Eukaryota
- Kingdom: Animalia
- Phylum: Chordata
- Class: Mammalia
- Order: Rodentia
- Family: Muridae
- Subfamily: Murinae
- Tribe: Arvicanthini
- Genus: Desmomys; Thomas, 1910

Type species
- Pelomys harringtoni

Species
- Desmomys harringtoni Desmomys yaldeni

Genus of rodents

Desmomys is a genus of rodent in the family Muridae endemic to Ethiopia. It contains the following species:

- Harrington's rat, D. harringtoni
- Yalden's rat, D. yaldeni
