= Mount Oku rat =

Conservation status
- Endangered (IUCN 3.1)

Scientific classification
- Kingdom: Animalia
- Phylum: Chordata
- Class: Mammalia
- Order: Rodentia
- Family: Muridae
- Tribe: Arvicanthini
- Genus: Lamottemys; Petter, 1986
- Species: L. okuensis

Binomial name
- Lamottemys okuensis Petter, 1986

Species of rodent

The Mount Oku rat (Lamottemys okuensis) is a species of rodent in the family Muridae. It is the only species in the genus Lamottemys. It is found only in Cameroon where its natural habitat is subtropical or tropical moist montane forests. It is threatened by habitat destruction.

== Description ==
The Mount Oku rat is a medium-sized species growing to a head-and-body length of about 126 mm (5 in). The dorsal fur is glossy and soft, dark brownish-black tinged with russet, with no stripe along the spine. The individual hairs are dark grey, banded with ochre and with black tips, and there are numerous longer, black guard hairs. The underparts are yellowish-grey, the hairs having grey bases and yellowish tips. The limbs are yellowish-brown, with four digits on the front feet and five digits on the hind. The tail is about the same length as the body, and is covered with scales and small black bristles.

== Distribution and habitat ==
This rat is endemic to Cameroon in West Africa where it is only known from the forested slopes of Mount Oku at altitudes of between 2,100 and 3,000 m (6,890 and 9,840 ft) in areas with thorn-bushes, dense undergrowth and rough vegetation. It is unclear whether it can adapt to secondary growth forest.

== Ecology ==
This species is probably herbivorous and terrestrial, based on its body proportions. One female captured in the dry season (January) contained a single developing embryo, so litter sizes may be low. Genets and mongooses are likely to be predators of this rat, and it is also hunted for food by local villagers.

== Status ==
This rat has a limited range, its total area of occupancy being about 500 km^{2} (193 mi^{2}), with all the population being located on the forested slopes of Mount Oku. The International Union for Conservation of Nature has assessed its conservation status as being "endangered", based on the continuing degradation of the forest, parts of which are being cleared for agricultural purposes.
