= Hatt's thicket rat =

Scientific classification
- Kingdom: Animalia
- Phylum: Chordata
- Class: Mammalia
- Order: Rodentia
- Family: Muridae
- Genus: Thamnomys
- Species: T. major

Binomial name
- Thamnomys major (Hatt, 1934)

Species of rodent

Hatt's thicket rat (Thamnomys major), is a species of thicket rat indigenous to the northern slopes of Mount Karisimbi, an inactive volcano in North Kivu (Nord-Kivu) province of the Democratic Republic of the Congo (DRC). Since the species is identifiable only via the holotype, its exact distribution is indeterminable. Contemporary analysis suggests a 'significant' difference in the size of the holotype and T. kempi, where the former also exhibits molar features atypical of the later. Yet other specimens collected from the slopes of Mount Karisimbi, rats that Hatt had considered as examples of T. major, were subsequently described as consistent with T. kempi.
