= Selous thicket rat =

Conservation status
- Least Concern (IUCN 3.1)

Scientific classification
- Kingdom: Animalia
- Phylum: Chordata
- Class: Mammalia
- Order: Rodentia
- Family: Muridae
- Genus: Grammomys
- Species: G. selousi

Binomial name
- Grammomys selousi Denys, Lalis, Lecompte, Cornette, Moulin, Makundi, Machang'u, Volobouev & Aniskine, 2011

Species of rodent

The Selous thicket rat (Grammomys selousi) is a species of rodent endemic to Tanzania.
