= Parapelomys =

Parapelomys Temporal range: Neogene

Scientific classification
- Kingdom: Animalia
- Phylum: Chordata
- Class: Mammalia
- Infraclass: Placentalia
- Order: Rodentia
- Family: Muridae
- Genus: †Parapelomys; Jacobs, 1978
- Species: †P. robertsi

Binomial name
- †Parapelomys robertsi Jacobs, 1978

Extinct genus of rodents

Parapelomys is an extinct genus of murid rodent that lived during the Neogene.

== Palaeoecology ==
Parapelomys robertsi had much lower δ^{13}C values than the contemporary Karnimata huxleyi, suggesting the former consumed grass much less often than the latter.
