= Harrington's rat =

Conservation status
- Least Concern (IUCN 3.1)

Scientific classification
- Domain: Eukaryota
- Kingdom: Animalia
- Phylum: Chordata
- Class: Mammalia
- Order: Rodentia
- Family: Muridae
- Genus: Desmomys
- Species: D. harringtoni

Binomial name
- Desmomys harringtoni (Thomas, 1902)

Species of rodent

Harrington's rat (Desmomys harringtoni) is a species of rodent in the family Muridae. It is found only in Ethiopia. Its natural habitats are subtropical or tropical moist montane forests and subtropical or tropical moist shrubland.
