= Bunting's thicket rat =

Conservation status
- Data Deficient (IUCN 3.1)

Scientific classification
- Kingdom: Animalia
- Phylum: Chordata
- Class: Mammalia
- Order: Rodentia
- Family: Muridae
- Genus: Grammomys
- Species: G. buntingi

Binomial name
- Grammomys buntingi (Thomas, 1911)

Species of rodent

Bunting's thicket rat (Grammomys buntingi) is a species of rodent in the family Muridae. It is found in Ivory Coast, Guinea, Liberia, Senegal, and Sierra Leone. Its natural habitats are subtropical or tropical moist lowland forests and subtropical or tropical moist shrubland.
