= Pelomys =

Pelomys Temporal range: Early Pliocene - Recent

Scientific classification
- Domain: Eukaryota
- Kingdom: Animalia
- Phylum: Chordata
- Class: Mammalia
- Order: Rodentia
- Family: Muridae
- Tribe: Arvicanthini
- Genus: Pelomys; Peters, 1852

Type species
- Mus (Pelomys) fallax

Species
- Pelomys campanae Pelomys fallax Pelomys hopkinsi Pelomys isseli Pelomys minor

Genus of rodents

Pelomys is a genus of rodent in the family Muridae endemic to Africa. It contains the following species:

- Bell groove-toothed swamp rat (Pelomys campanae)
- Creek groove-toothed swamp rat (Pelomys fallax)
- Hopkins's groove-toothed swamp rat (Pelomys hopkinsi)
- Issel's groove-toothed swamp rat (Pelomys isseli)
- Least groove-toothed swamp rat (Pelomys minor)
