= Ethiopian mylomys =

Conservation status
- Data Deficient (IUCN 3.1)

Scientific classification
- Kingdom: Animalia
- Phylum: Chordata
- Class: Mammalia
- Order: Rodentia
- Family: Muridae
- Genus: Mylomys
- Species: M. rex

Binomial name
- Mylomys rex (Thomas, 1906)

Species of mammal

The Ethiopian mylomys (Mylomys rex) is a species of rodent in the family Muridae. It is only found in Ethiopia.
