= Mylomys =

Scientific classification
- Domain: Eukaryota
- Kingdom: Animalia
- Phylum: Chordata
- Class: Mammalia
- Order: Rodentia
- Family: Muridae
- Subfamily: Murinae
- Tribe: Arvicanthini
- Genus: Mylomys; Thomas, 1906

Type species
- Mylomys cuninghamei

Species
- Mylomys dybowskii Mylomys rex

Genus of rodents

Mylomys is a genus of rodent in the family Muridae. It contains the following species:

- African groove-toothed rat (Mylomys dybowskii)
- Ethiopian mylomys (Mylomys rex)
