= Ethiopian thicket rat =

Conservation status
- Vulnerable (IUCN 3.1)

Scientific classification
- Kingdom: Animalia
- Phylum: Chordata
- Class: Mammalia
- Order: Rodentia
- Family: Muridae
- Genus: Grammomys
- Species: G. minnae

Binomial name
- Grammomys minnae Hutterer & Dieterlen, 1984

Species of rodent

The Ethiopian thicket rat (Grammomys minnae) is a species of rodent in the family Muridae. It is found only in Ethiopia. Its natural habitat is subtropical or tropical dry shrubland. It is threatened by habitat loss.
