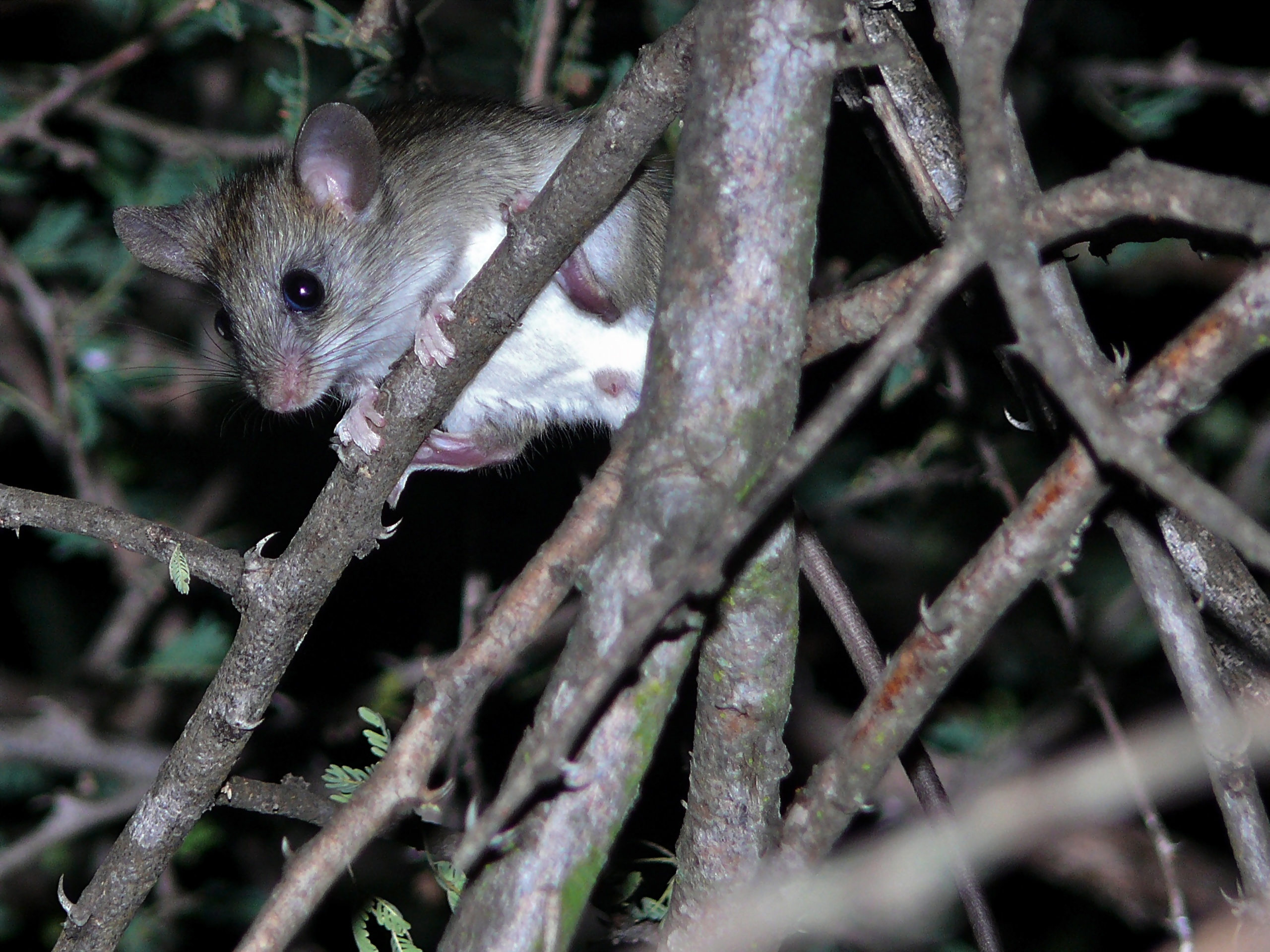

Conservation status
- Least Concern (IUCN 3.1)

Scientific classification
- Kingdom: Animalia
- Phylum: Chordata
- Class: Mammalia
- Infraclass: Placentalia
- Order: Rodentia
- Family: Muridae
- Genus: Grammomys
- Species: G. dolichurus

Binomial name
- Grammomys dolichurus (Smuts, 1832)

Synonyms
- Mus arborarius True, 1892; Thamnomys discolor Thomas, 1910; Thamnomys surdaster Thomas and Wroughton, 1908; Thamnomys dolichurus littoralis Heller, 1912; Thamnomys surdaster polionops Osgood, 1910

= Woodland thicket rat =

Species of rodent

The woodland thicket rat (Grammomys dolichurus), also known as the woodland mouse, is a species of rodent in the family Muridae. It is found in Angola, Burundi, Republic of the Congo, Democratic Republic of the Congo, Ethiopia, Kenya, Malawi, Mozambique, Rwanda, South Africa, South Sudan, Eswatini, Tanzania, Zambia, Zimbabwe and Uganda. Its natural habitats are subtropical or tropical dry forest, subtropical or tropical moist lowland forest, subtropical or tropical dry shrubland, subtropical or tropical moist shrubland, subtropical or tropical high-altitude shrubland, subtropical or tropical dry lowland grassland, arable land, pastureland, and urban areas. It has a total length of 27 cm and its mass is 30g. Nests are made of fine grass and vegetation, usually up to 2 m above ground, and in some cases they make use of the nests of weaver birds (Ploceidae).
