= Saidomys =

Saidomys Temporal range: Pliocene

Scientific classification
- Kingdom: Animalia
- Phylum: Chordata
- Class: Mammalia
- Order: Rodentia
- Family: Muridae
- Genus: †Saidomys; James & Slaughter, 1974

Type species
- Saidomys natrunensis James & Slaughter, 1974

Other species
- Saidomys afarensis Sabatier, 1982

Saidomys is an extinct genus of murid rodent that lived in Africa during the Pliocene epoch.

== Distribution ==
Saidomys afarensis hails from the mid-Pliocene of Ethiopia, whereas Saidomys natrunensis is known from the mid-Pliocene of Egypt.

== Palaeoecology ==
The dental microwear of S. afarensis bears the most similarities to that of extant rodents that consume grass, suggesting that S. afarensis too was primarily an eater of grass.
