= Target rat =

Conservation status
- Least Concern (IUCN 3.1)

Scientific classification
- Kingdom: Animalia
- Phylum: Chordata
- Class: Mammalia
- Infraclass: Placentalia
- Order: Rodentia
- Family: Muridae
- Subfamily: Murinae
- Tribe: Arvicanthini
- Genus: Stochomys; Thomas, 1926
- Species: S. longicaudatus

Binomial name
- Stochomys longicaudatus (Tullberg, 1893)
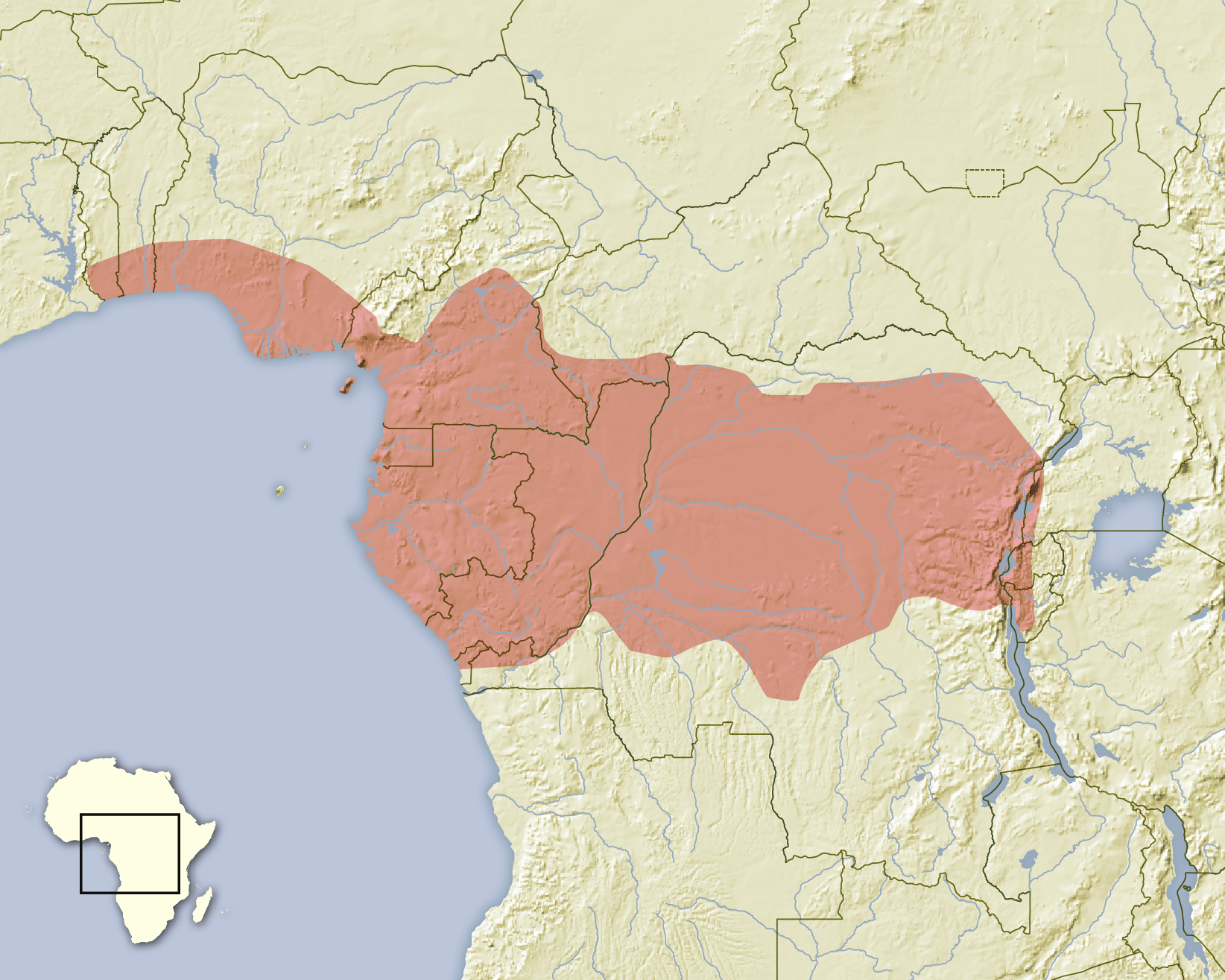

Synonyms
- Mus sebastianus Trouessart, 1897

Species of African rodent

The target rat (Stochomys longicaudatus) is a species of rodent in the family Muridae. It is the only species in the genus Stochomys. Its natural habitat is subtropical or tropical moist lowland forests.

== Description ==
The target rat is a moderately sized rat-like rodent, with a head-body length of 13 to 17 centimetres (5.1 to 6.7 in) and weighing around 90 grams (3.2 oz). The fur is dark reddish-brown over the back, becoming greyish on the flanks, and fading to pale grey on the underparts. The sparsely bristled tail is much longer than the body, being typically 18 to 22 centimetres (7.1 to 8.7 in) in length. Females have six teats. It is so named because it has a number of long dark bristles projecting from its rump which resemble the shafts of arrows in a target. The synonym Mus sebastianus also refers to this, Saint Sebastian being an early Christian martyr said to have been tied to a tree and shot with arrows.

== Distribution and habitat ==
The target rat is native to humid rainforests in tropical western Central Africa at elevations from sea level to 1,000 metres (3,300 ft). Its range extends from Togo through Benin and Nigeria to the Congo Basin and eastwards to western Uganda. It occurs in swampy areas of forests and in gallery forests and beside streams. It has also been observed in secondary forests around villages and in banana plantations.

Two subspecies are currently recognised:

- S. l. longicaudatus (Tullberg 1893) - Togo to the Republic of the Congo
- S. l. ituricus (Thomas, 1915) - the Democratic Republic of the Congo, Rwanda, Burundi, western Uganda

== Biology and behaviour ==
The target rat is largely nocturnal and feeds on the ground on green vegetable material and fallen fruit, supplementing these with some insects. In addition to moving along the ground, it often climbs into the rainforest understory, although not high into trees. It has been reported to construct spherical nests of shredded grass. Little is known of the social organisation of this species but in Cameroon a group of thirteen was caught at one location in an oil palm plantation. Breeding takes place throughout the year, but may be more common between February and May and between September and December. Litters range from one to four young.

== Status ==
The target rat has a wide range and is a common species. It is presumed to have a large population and no particular threats have been identified. The International Union for Conservation of Nature has rated its conservation status as being of "least concern".
