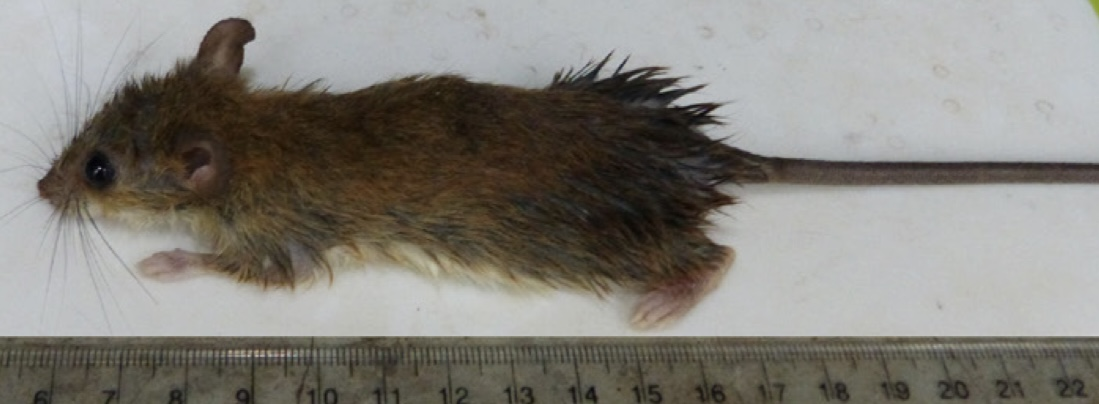

Conservation status
- Least Concern (IUCN 3.1)

Scientific classification
- Kingdom: Animalia
- Phylum: Chordata
- Class: Mammalia
- Order: Rodentia
- Family: Muridae
- Genus: Grammomys
- Species: G. cometes

Binomial name
- Grammomys cometes (Thomas & Wroughton, 1908)

= Mozambique thicket rat =

Species of rodent

The Mozambique thicket rat (Grammomys cometes) is an African species of rodent in the mouse family, Muridae. It is found in Mozambique, South Africa, and Zimbabwe. Its natural habitat is subtropical or tropical dry forests.
