= Thamnomys =

Thamnomys Temporal range: Late Pleistocene to Recent

Scientific classification
- Domain: Eukaryota
- Kingdom: Animalia
- Phylum: Chordata
- Class: Mammalia
- Order: Rodentia
- Family: Muridae
- Tribe: Arvicanthini
- Genus: Thamnomys; Thomas, 1907

Type species
- Thamnomys venustus

Species
- Thamnomys kempi; Thamnomys major; Thamnomys venustus

Genus of rodents

Thamnomys is a genus of Old World rats from East Central Africa.

== Species ==
- Genus Thamnomys
  - Kemp's thicket rat - Thamnomys kempi Dollman, 1911
  - Hatt's thicket rat - Thamnomys major Hatt, 1934
  - Charming thicket rat - Thamnomys venustus Thomas, 1907
