= Arid thicket rat =

Conservation status
- Data Deficient (IUCN 3.1)

Scientific classification
- Kingdom: Animalia
- Phylum: Chordata
- Class: Mammalia
- Order: Rodentia
- Family: Muridae
- Genus: Grammomys
- Species: G. aridulus

Binomial name
- Grammomys aridulus Thomas & Hinton, 1923

Species of rodent

The arid thicket rat (Grammomys aridulus) is a species of rodent in the family Muridae. It is found only in Sudan. Its natural habitat is subtropical or tropical dry shrubland. This species is currently listed on the "Nearly Threatened" list in its ranking of endangerment. Offspring of this species are commonly referred to as "kittens" or "pups". The female is referred to as a "doe", while the male is referred to as a "buck". These creatures commonly roam in groups, called a "horde", "pack", or "storm".
