= Bell groove-toothed swamp rat =

Conservation status
- Least Concern (IUCN 3.1)

Scientific classification
- Domain: Eukaryota
- Kingdom: Animalia
- Phylum: Chordata
- Class: Mammalia
- Order: Rodentia
- Family: Muridae
- Genus: Pelomys
- Species: P. campanae

Binomial name
- Pelomys campanae (Huet, 1888)

Species of rodent

The bell groove-toothed swamp rat (Pelomys campanae) is a species of rodent in the family Muridae found in Angola and the Democratic Republic of the Congo. Its natural habitats are moist savanna, subtropical or tropical dry lowland grassland, arable land, and rural gardens.
