= Gray-headed thicket rat =

Conservation status
- Data Deficient (IUCN 3.1)

Scientific classification
- Kingdom: Animalia
- Phylum: Chordata
- Class: Mammalia
- Order: Rodentia
- Family: Muridae
- Genus: Grammomys
- Species: G. caniceps

Binomial name
- Grammomys caniceps Hutterer & Dieterlen, 1984

Species of rodent

The gray-headed thicket rat (Grammomys caniceps) is a species of rodent in the family Muridae. It is found in Kenya and Somalia. Its natural habitat is subtropical or tropical dry shrubland.
