= Yalden's rat =

Conservation status
- Vulnerable (IUCN 3.1)

Scientific classification
- Kingdom: Animalia
- Phylum: Chordata
- Class: Mammalia
- Order: Rodentia
- Family: Muridae
- Genus: Desmomys
- Species: D. yaldeni

Binomial name
- Desmomys yaldeni Lavrenchenko, 2003

Species of rodent

Yalden's rat (Desmomys yaldeni) is a species of rodent in the family Muridae, found only in Ethiopia, where its natural habitat is the montane forests. It is threatened by habitat loss.

The rat got its name in honour of Derek Yalden, a zoologist.
