= Short-snouted thicket rat =

Conservation status
- Data Deficient (IUCN 3.1)

Scientific classification
- Kingdom: Animalia
- Phylum: Chordata
- Class: Mammalia
- Order: Rodentia
- Family: Muridae
- Genus: Grammomys
- Species: G. brevirostris

Binomial name
- Grammomys brevirostris Kryštufek, 2008

Species of rodent

The short-snouted thicket rat (Grammomys brevirostris) is a species of rodent endemic to Kenya.
