= Least groove-toothed swamp rat =

Conservation status
- Least Concern (IUCN 3.1)

Scientific classification
- Domain: Eukaryota
- Kingdom: Animalia
- Phylum: Chordata
- Class: Mammalia
- Order: Rodentia
- Family: Muridae
- Genus: Pelomys
- Species: P. minor

Binomial name
- Pelomys minor Cabrera & Ruxton, 1926

Species of rodent

The least groove-toothed swamp rat (Pelomys minor) is a species of rodent in the family Muridae. It is found in Angola, Democratic Republic of the Congo, Tanzania, and Zambia. Its natural habitat is moist savanna.
