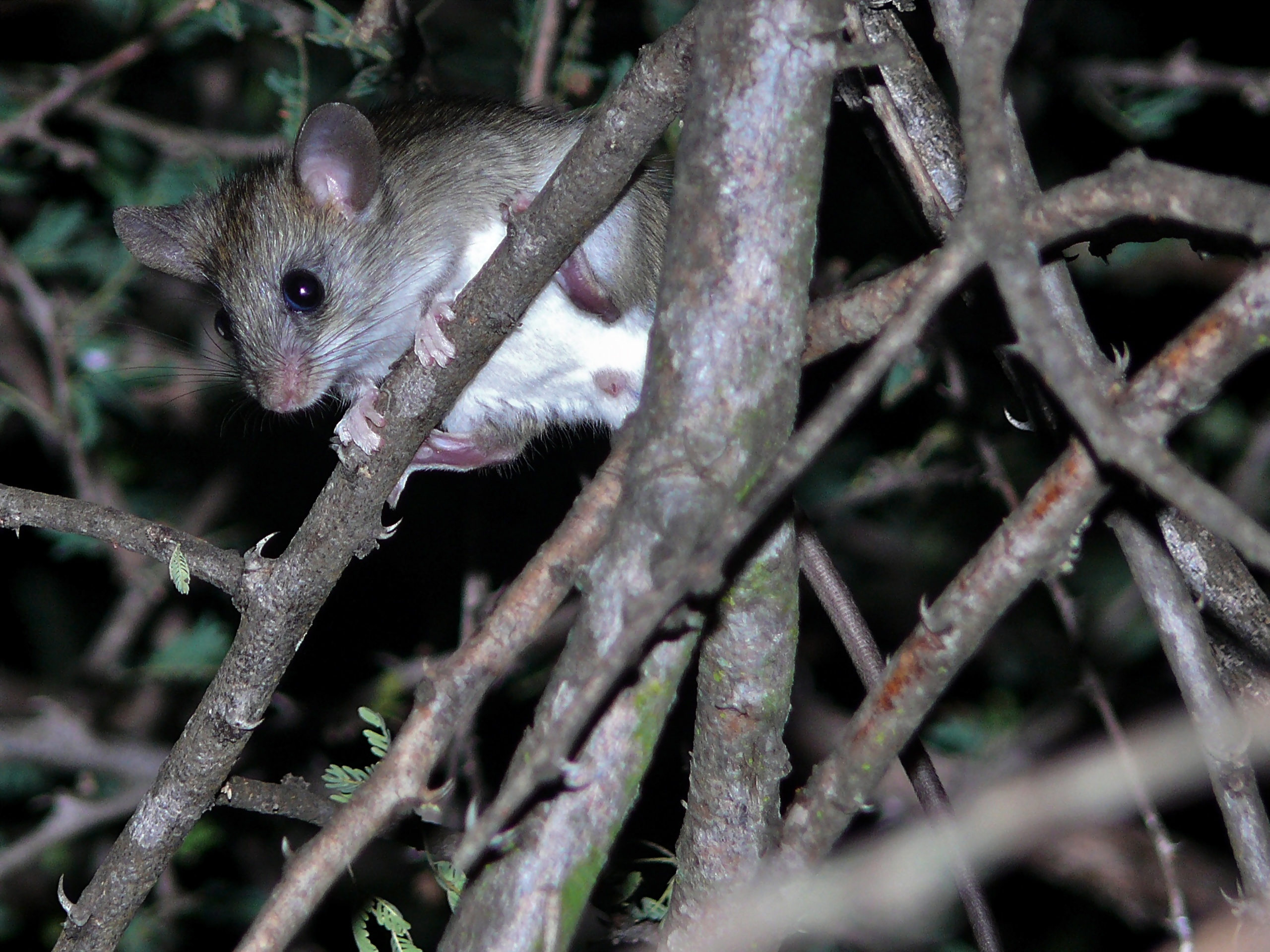
- Woodland thicket rat (Grammomys dolichurus)

Scientific classification
- Kingdom: Animalia
- Phylum: Chordata
- Class: Mammalia
- Order: Rodentia
- Family: Muridae
- Tribe: Arvicanthini
- Genus: Grammomys; Thomas, 1915

Type species
- Mus dolichurus

Species
- Grammomys aridulus Grammomys brevirostris Grammomys buntingi Grammomys caniceps Grammomys cometes Grammomys dolichurus Grammomys dryas Grammomys gigas Grammomys ibeanus Grammomys kuru Grammomys macmillani Grammomys minnae Grammomys poensis Grammomys selousi Grammomys surdaster

= Grammomys =

Grammomys Temporal range: Late Pliocene to Recent

Genus of rodents

Grammomys is a genus of rodent in the family Muridae endemic to Africa. It contains the following species:

- Arid thicket rat (Grammomys aridulus)
- Short-snouted thicket rat (Grammomys brevirostris)
- Bunting's thicket rat (Grammomys buntingi)
- Gray-headed thicket rat (Grammomys caniceps)
- Mozambique thicket rat (Grammomys cometes)
- Woodland thicket rat (Grammomys dolichurus)
- Forest thicket rat (Grammomys dryas)
- Giant thicket rat (Grammomys gigas)
- Ruwenzori thicket rat (Grammomys ibeanus)
- Eastern rainforest grammomys (Grammomys kuru)
- Macmillan's thicket rat (Grammomys macmillani)
- Ethiopian thicket rat (Grammomys minnae)
- Shining thicket rat (Grammomys poensis)
- Selous thicket rat (Grammomys selousi)
- African woodland thicket rat (Grammomys surdaster)
