= Hopkins's groove-toothed swamp rat =

Conservation status
- Data Deficient (IUCN 3.1)

Scientific classification
- Kingdom: Animalia
- Phylum: Chordata
- Class: Mammalia
- Order: Rodentia
- Family: Muridae
- Genus: Pelomys
- Species: P. hopkinsi

Binomial name
- Pelomys hopkinsi Hayman, 1955

Species of rodent

Hopkins's groove-toothed swamp rat (Pelomys hopkinsi) is a species of rodent in the family Muridae. It is found in Kenya, Rwanda, Uganda, possibly Burundi, and possibly Tanzania. Its natural habitat is swamps. It is threatened by habitat loss.

The rat was described by Robert William Hayman in 1955. It is named after the entomologist, George Henry Evans Hopkins, O.B.E., M.A., F.R.E.S. (1898-1973), who lived and worked in Uganda for many years, and was noted for his researches on three groups of insects: lice, fleas and mosquitoes. Hopkins had collaborated with Hayman and Reginald Ernest Moreau in the publication of "The type-localities of some African mammals" in The Proceedings of the Zoological Society of London in 1946.
