= Forest thicket rat =

Conservation status
- Least Concern (IUCN 3.1)

Scientific classification
- Kingdom: Animalia
- Phylum: Chordata
- Class: Mammalia
- Order: Rodentia
- Family: Muridae
- Genus: Grammomys
- Species: G. dryas

Binomial name
- Grammomys dryas (Thomas, 1907)

Species of rodent

The forest thicket rat (Grammomys dryas) is a species of rodent in the family Muridae. It is found in Burundi, Democratic Republic of the Congo, and Uganda. Its natural habitat is subtropical or tropical moist montane forests.

== Sources ==
- Musser, G. G.; Carleton, M. D. (2005). "Superfamily Muroidea". In Wilson, D. E.; Reeder, D. M. (eds.). Mammal Species of the World: A Taxonomic and Geographic Reference (3rd ed.). Johns Hopkins University Press. p. 1325. ISBN 978-0-8018-8221-0. OCLC 62265494.
