= Creek groove-toothed swamp rat =

Conservation status
- Least Concern (IUCN 3.1)

Scientific classification
- Domain: Eukaryota
- Kingdom: Animalia
- Phylum: Chordata
- Class: Mammalia
- Order: Rodentia
- Family: Muridae
- Genus: Pelomys
- Species: P. fallax

Binomial name
- Pelomys fallax (Peters, 1852)

Species of rodent

The creek groove-toothed swamp rat (Pelomys fallax) is a species of rodent in the family Muridae. It is found in Angola, Burundi, Democratic Republic of the Congo, Kenya, Malawi, Mozambique, Namibia, Rwanda, Tanzania, Uganda, Zambia, and Zimbabwe. Its natural habitats are moist savanna and pastureland.
