= Kemp's thicket rat =

Conservation status
- Vulnerable (IUCN 3.1)

Scientific classification
- Kingdom: Animalia
- Phylum: Chordata
- Class: Mammalia
- Order: Rodentia
- Family: Muridae
- Genus: Thamnomys
- Species: T. kempi

Binomial name
- Thamnomys kempi Dollman, 1911
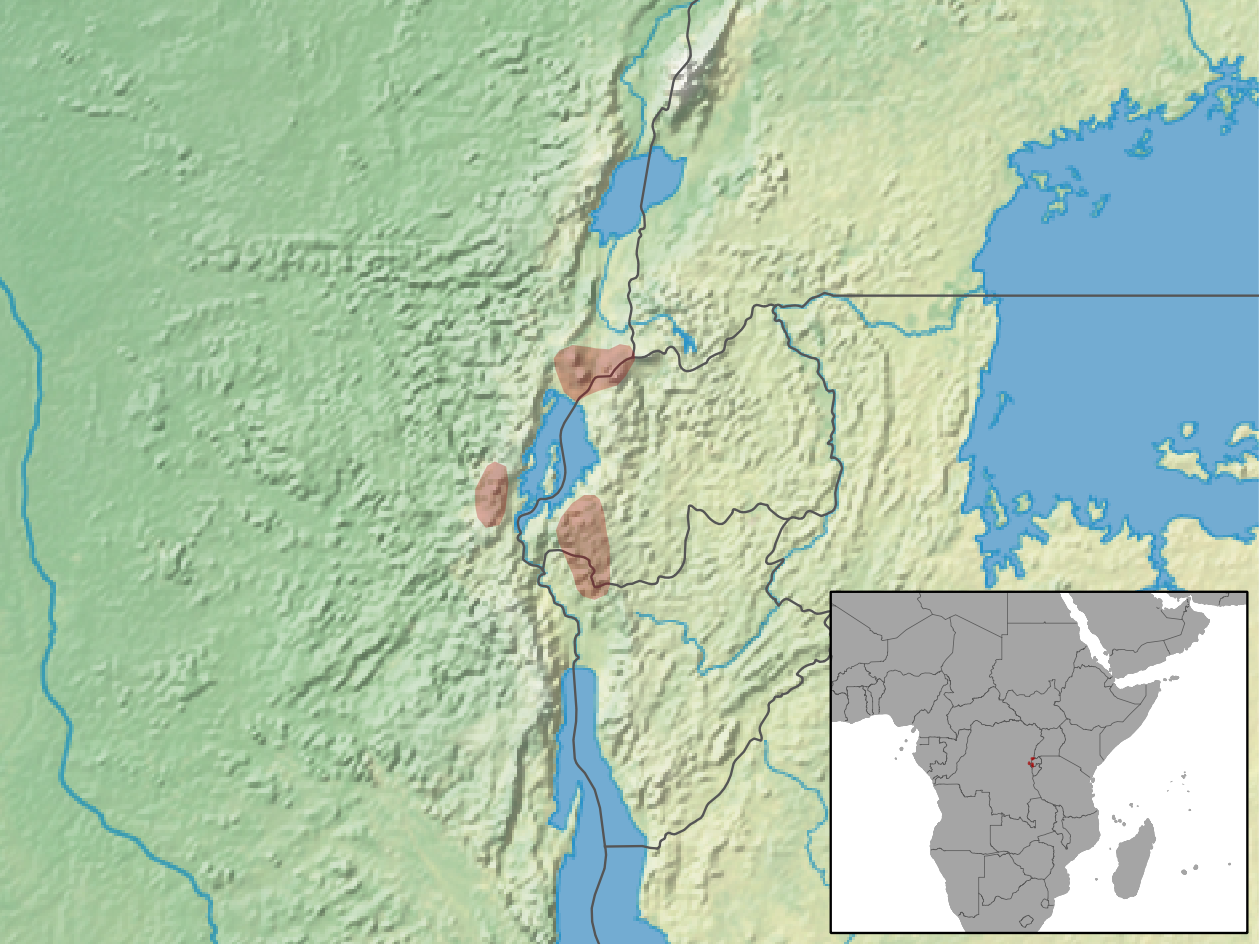

Species of rodent

Kemp's thicket rat (Thamnomys kempi) is a species of rodent in the family Muridae. It is found in Burundi, Democratic Republic of the Congo, and Rwanda. Its natural habitat is subtropical or tropical moist montane forests. It is threatened by habitat loss.

== Sources ==
- Musser, G. G.; Carleton, M. D. (2005). "Superfamily Muroidea". In Wilson, D. E.; Reeder, D. M. (eds.). Mammal Species of the World: A Taxonomic and Geographic Reference (3rd ed.). Johns Hopkins University Press. p. 1511. ISBN 978-0-8018-8221-0. OCLC 62265494.
