= Macmillan's thicket rat =

Conservation status
- Least Concern (IUCN 3.1)

Scientific classification
- Kingdom: Animalia
- Phylum: Chordata
- Class: Mammalia
- Order: Rodentia
- Family: Muridae
- Genus: Grammomys
- Species: G. macmillani

Binomial name
- Grammomys macmillani (Wroughton, 1907)

Species of rodent

Macmillan's thicket rat (Grammomys macmillani) is a species of rodent in the family Muridae. It is found in Central African Republic, Democratic Republic of the Congo, Ethiopia, Kenya, South Sudan, Tanzania, and Uganda. Its natural habitats are subtropical or tropical moist lowland forest, subtropical or tropical swamps, subtropical or tropical seasonally wet or flooded lowland grassland, shrub-dominated wetlands, and urban areas.
