= Issel's groove-toothed swamp rat =

Conservation status
- Near Threatened (IUCN 3.1)

Scientific classification
- Kingdom: Animalia
- Phylum: Chordata
- Class: Mammalia
- Order: Rodentia
- Family: Muridae
- Genus: Pelomys
- Species: P. isseli

Binomial name
- Pelomys isseli (de Beaux, 1924)

Species of rodent

Issel's groove-toothed swamp rat (Pelomys isseli) is a species of rodent in the family Muridae. It is found only in Uganda. Its natural habitats are arable land and rural gardens. It is threatened by habitat loss.

== Sources ==
- Musser, G. G.; Carleton, M. D. (2005). "Superfamily Muroidea". In Wilson, D. E.; Reeder, D. M. (eds.). Mammal Species of the World: A Taxonomic and Geographic Reference (3rd ed.). Johns Hopkins University Press. pp. 894–1531. ISBN 978-0-8018-8221-0. OCLC 62265494.
