= Charming thicket rat =

Conservation status
- Least Concern (IUCN 3.1)

Scientific classification
- Kingdom: Animalia
- Phylum: Chordata
- Class: Mammalia
- Order: Rodentia
- Family: Muridae
- Genus: Thamnomys
- Species: T. venustus

Binomial name
- Thamnomys venustus Thomas, 1907
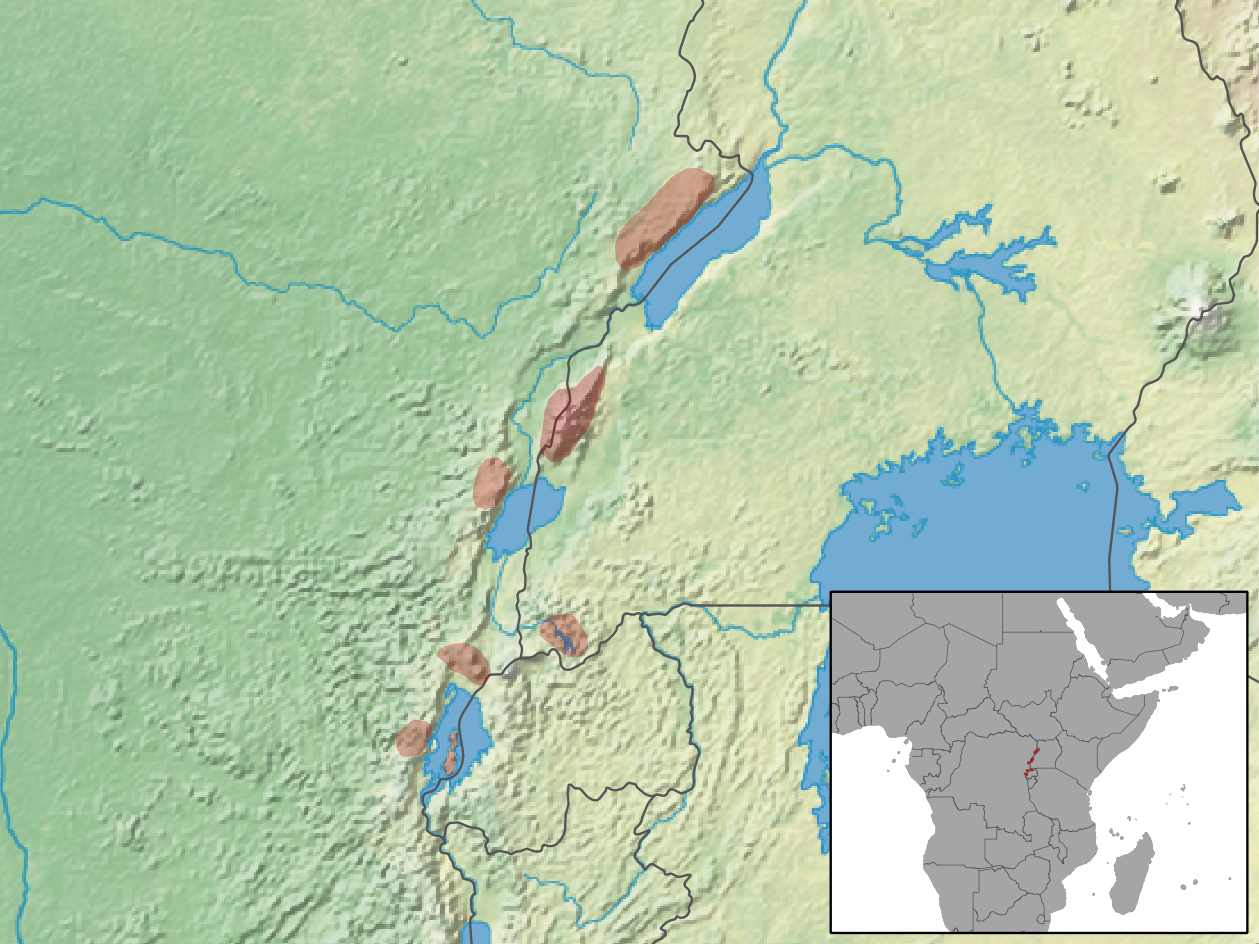

Synonyms
- schoutedeni Hatt, 1934

Species of rodent

The charming thicket rat (Thamnomys venustus) is a species of rodent in the family Muridae. It is described as data deficient as Thamnomys schoutedeni. It is found in Democratic Republic of the Congo, Rwanda, and Uganda. Its natural habitat is subtropical or tropical moist montane forests. It is threatened by habitat loss.
