= Ruwenzori thicket rat =

Conservation status
- Least Concern (IUCN 3.1)

Scientific classification
- Kingdom: Animalia
- Phylum: Chordata
- Class: Mammalia
- Order: Rodentia
- Family: Muridae
- Genus: Grammomys
- Species: G. ibeanus

Binomial name
- Grammomys ibeanus (Osgood, 1910)

Species of rodent

The Ruwenzori thicket rat (Grammomys ibeanus) is a species of rodent in the family Muridae. It is found in Kenya, Malawi, South Sudan, Tanzania, Uganda, and Zambia. Its natural habitats are subtropical or tropical moist montane forests and subtropical or tropical high-altitude shrubland. It is threatened by habitat loss.
