= Shining thicket rat =

Shining Thicket Rat

Conservation status
- Least Concern (IUCN 3.1)

Scientific classification
- Domain: Eukaryota
- Kingdom: Animalia
- Phylum: Chordata
- Class: Mammalia
- Order: Rodentia
- Family: Muridae
- Genus: Grammomys
- Species: G. poensis

Binomial name
- Grammomys poensis (Eisentraut, 1965)

Synonyms
- Grammomys rutilans (Peters, 1876); Thamnomys rutilans

Species of rodent

The shining thicket rat (Grammomys poensis) is a species of rodent in the family Muridae.

== Distribution and habitat ==
It is found in Angola, Burundi, Cameroon, Central African Republic, Republic of the Congo, Democratic Republic of the Congo, Ivory Coast, Equatorial Guinea, Gabon, Ghana, Guinea, Liberia, Nigeria, Rwanda, and Uganda.

Its natural habitats are subtropical or tropical moist lowland forest, subtropical or tropical moist montane forest, and subtropical or tropical moist shrubland.

== Synonyms and homonyms ==
The species is more commonly referred to as G. rutilans, but Musser and Carleton (2005) noted that Mus rutilans Peters, 1876 is a junior homonym of Mus rutilans Olfers, 1818, which refers to the South American Oxymycterus rutilans.
