= List of mammals of Rwanda =

This is a list of the mammal species recorded in Rwanda. There are 189 mammal species in Rwanda, of which two are critically endangered, four are endangered, eleven are vulnerable, and five are near threatened.

The following tags are used to highlight each species' conservation status as assessed by the International Union for Conservation of Nature:

EX	Extinct	No reasonable doubt that the last individual has died.
EW	Extinct in the wild	Known only to survive in captivity or as a naturalized populations well outside its previous range.
CR	Critically endangered	The species is in imminent risk of extinction in the wild.
EN	Endangered	The species is facing an extremely high risk of extinction in the wild.
VU	Vulnerable	The species is facing a high risk of extinction in the wild.
NT	Near threatened	The species does not meet any of the criteria that would categorise it as risking extinction but it is likely to do so in the future.
LC	Least concern	There are no current identifiable risks to the species.
DD	Data deficient	There is inadequate information to make an assessment of the risks to this species.

Some species were assessed using an earlier set of criteria. Species assessed using this system have the following instead of near threatened and least concern categories:

LR/cd	Lower risk/conservation dependent	Species which were the focus of conservation programmes and may have moved into a higher risk category if that programme was discontinued.
LR/nt	Lower risk/near threatened	Species which are close to being classified as vulnerable but are not the subject of conservation programmes.
LR/lc	Lower risk/least concern	Species for which there are no identifiable risks.

== Order: Tubulidentata (aardvarks) ==
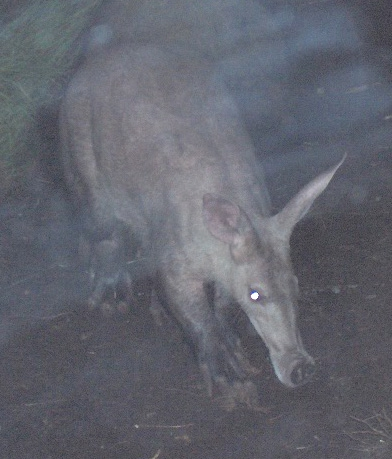
Aardvark

The order Tubulidentata consists of a single species, the aardvark. Tubulidentata are characterised by their teeth which lack a pulp cavity and form thin tubes which are continuously worn down and replaced.

- Family: Orycteropodidae
  - Genus: Orycteropus
    - Aardvark, O. afer LC

== Order: Hyracoidea (hyraxes) ==
The hyraxes are any of four species of fairly small, thickset, herbivorous mammals in the order Hyracoidea. About the size of a domestic cat, they are well-furred with rounded bodies and a stumpy tail. They are native to Africa and the Middle East.

- Family: Procaviidae (hyraxes)
  - Genus: Dendrohyrax
    - Western tree hyrax, D. dorsalis LC
  - Genus: Heterohyrax
    - Yellow-spotted rock hyrax, H. brucei LC

== Order: Proboscidea (elephants) ==
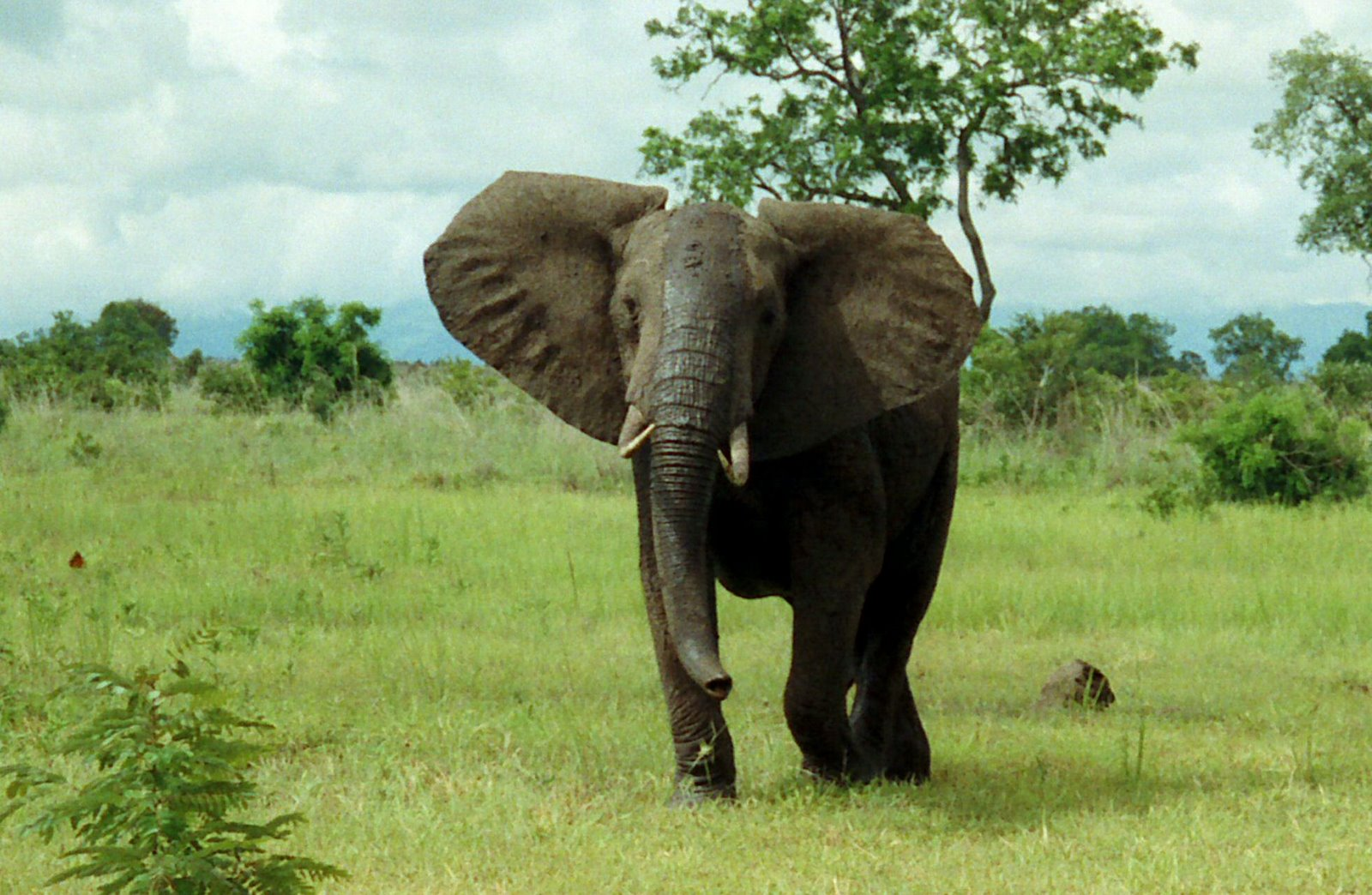
African bush elephant

The elephants comprise three living species and are the largest living land animals.

- Family: Elephantidae (elephants)
  - Genus: Loxodonta
    - African bush elephant, L. africana EN

== Order: Primates ==
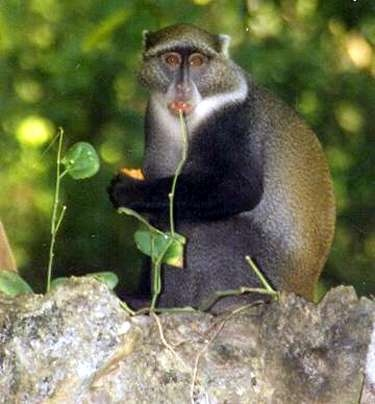
Blue monkey

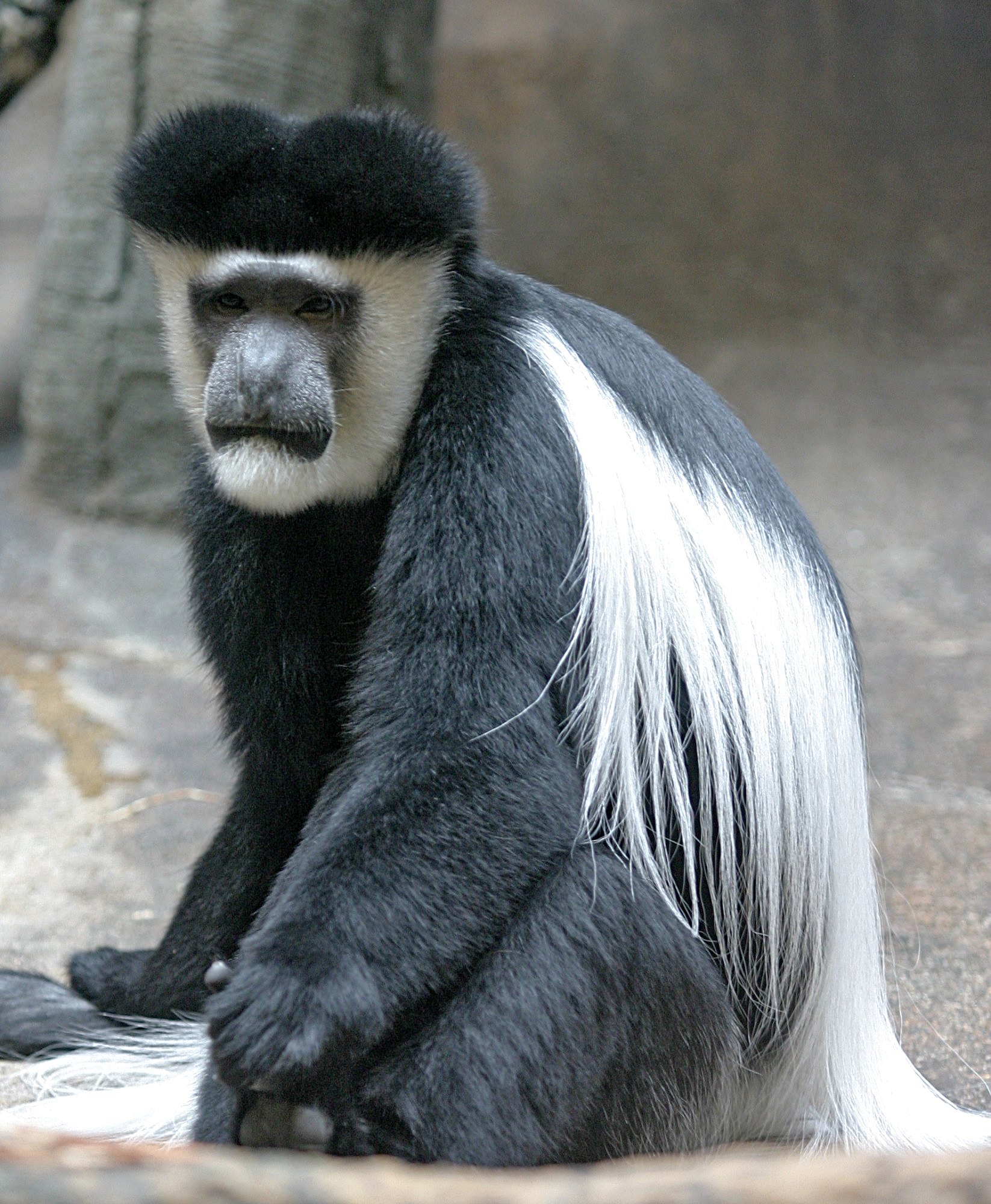
Mantled guereza

The order Primates contains humans and their closest relatives: lemurs, lorisoids, tarsiers, monkeys, and apes.

- Suborder: Strepsirrhini
  - Infraorder: Lemuriformes
    - Superfamily: Lorisoidea
      - Family: Lorisidae (lorises, bushbabies)
        - Genus: Perodicticus
          - Potto, Perodicticus potto LR/lc
      - Family: Galagidae
        - Genus: Galago
          - Dusky bushbaby, Galago matschiei LR/nt
          - Mohol bushbaby, Galago moholi LR/lc
          - Senegal bushbaby, Galago senegalensis LR/lc
        - Genus: Galagoides
          - Thomas's bushbaby, Galagoides thomasi LR/lc
          - Prince Demidoff's bushbaby, Galagoides demidovii LR/lc
        - Genus: Otolemur
          - Brown greater galago, Otolemur crassicaudatus LR/lc
- Suborder: Haplorhini
  - Infraorder: Simiiformes
    - Parvorder: Catarrhini
      - Superfamily: Cercopithecoidea
        - Family: Cercopithecidae (Old World monkeys)
          - Genus: Chlorocebus
            - Vervet monkey, Chlorocebus pygerythrus LR/lc
            - Tantalus monkey, Chlorocebus tantalus LR/lc
          - Genus: Cercopithecus
            - Red-tailed monkey, Cercopithecus ascanius LR/lc
            - Hamlyn's monkey, Cercopithecus hamlyni LR/nt
            - L'Hoest's monkey, Cercopithecus lhoesti LR/nt
            - Blue monkey, Cercopithecus mitis LR/lc
          - Genus: Lophocebus
            - Grey-cheeked mangabey, Lophocebus albigena LR/lc
          - Genus: Papio
            - Olive baboon, Papio anubis LR/lc
          - Subfamily: Colobinae
            - Genus: Colobus
              - Angola colobus, Colobus angolensis LR/lc
              - Mantled guereza, Colobus guereza LR/lc
      - Superfamily: Hominoidea
        - Family: Hominidae (great apes)
          - Subfamily: Homininae
            - Tribe: Gorillini
              - Genus: Gorilla
                - Eastern gorilla, Gorilla beringei EN
                  - Mountain gorilla, Gorilla beringei beringei EN
            - Tribe Hominini
              - Subtribe Panina
                - Genus: Pan
                  - Chimpanzee (common chimpanzee), Pan troglodytes EN
              - Subtribe Hominina
                - Genus: Homo
                  - Homo sapiens
                    - Anatomically modern human, Homo sapiens sapiens

== Order: Rodentia (rodents) ==
Rodents make up the largest order of mammals, with over 40% of mammalian species. They have two incisors in the upper and lower jaw which grow continually and must be kept short by gnawing. Most rodents are small though the capybara can weigh up to 45 kg (99 lb).

- Suborder: Hystricognathi
  - Family: Hystricidae (Old World porcupines)
    - Genus: Hystrix
      - Cape porcupine, Hystrix africaeaustralis LC
  - Family: Thryonomyidae (cane rats)
    - Genus: Thryonomys
      - Greater cane rat, Thryonomys swinderianus LC
- Suborder: Sciurognathi
  - Family: Sciuridae (squirrels)
    - Subfamily: Xerinae
      - Tribe: Xerini
        - Genus: Xerus
          - Striped ground squirrel, Xerus erythropus LC
      - Tribe: Protoxerini
        - Genus: Funisciurus
          - Carruther's mountain squirrel, Funisciurus carruthersi LC
        - Genus: Heliosciurus
          - Red-legged sun squirrel, Heliosciurus rufobrachium LC
          - Ruwenzori sun squirrel, Heliosciurus ruwenzorii LC
        - Genus: Paraxerus
          - Boehm's bush squirrel, Paraxerus boehmi LC
        - Genus: Protoxerus
          - Forest giant squirrel, Protoxerus stangeri LC
  - Family: Spalacidae
    - Subfamily: Tachyoryctinae
      - Genus: Tachyoryctes
        - Rwanda African mole-rat, Tachyoryctes ruandae LC
  - Family: Nesomyidae
    - Subfamily: Delanymyinae
      - Genus: Delanymys
        - Delany's swamp mouse, Delanymys brooksi EN
    - Subfamily: Dendromurinae
      - Genus: Dendromus
        - Montane African climbing mouse, Dendromus insignis LC
        - Kivu climbing mouse, Dendromus kivu LC
        - Gray climbing mouse, Dendromus melanotis LC
        - Chestnut climbing mouse, Dendromus mystacalis LC
    - Subfamily: Cricetomyinae
      - Genus: Cricetomys
        - Emin's pouched rat, Cricetomys emini LC
        - Gambian pouched rat, Cricetomys gambianus LC
  - Family: Muridae (mice, rats, voles, gerbils, hamsters, etc.)
    - Subfamily: Deomyinae
      - Genus: Deomys
        - Link rat, Deomys ferrugineus LC
      - Genus: Lophuromys
        - Medium-tailed brush-furred rat, Lophuromys medicaudatus NT
        - Rahm's brush-furred rat, Lophuromys rahmi NT
        - Woosnam's brush-furred rat, Lophuromys woosnami LC
    - Subfamily: Otomyinae
      - Genus: Otomys
        - Tropical vlei rat, Otomys tropicalis LC
    - Subfamily: Gerbillinae
      - Genus: Tatera
        - Boehm's gerbil, Tatera boehmi LC
        - Kemp's gerbil, Tatera kempi LC
        - Savanna gerbil, Tatera valida LC
    - Subfamily: Murinae
      - Genus: Aethomys
        - Hinde's rock rat, Aethomys hindei LC
        - Kaiser's rock rat, Aethomys kaiseri LC
      - Genus: Colomys
        - African wading rat, Colomys goslingi LC
      - Genus: Grammomys
        - Woodland thicket rat, Grammomys dolichurus LC
        - Shining thicket rat, Grammomys rutilans LC
      - Genus: Hybomys
        - Moon striped mouse, Hybomys lunaris VU
        - Peters's striped mouse, Hybomys univittatus LC
      - Genus: Hylomyscus
        - Montane wood mouse, Hylomyscus denniae LC
        - Stella wood mouse, Hylomyscus stella LC
      - Genus: Lemniscomys
        - Buffoon striped grass mouse, Lemniscomys macculus LC
        - Typical striped grass mouse, Lemniscomys striatus LC
      - Genus: Mastomys
        - Guinea multimammate mouse, Mastomys erythroleucus LC
        - Natal multimammate mouse, Mastomys natalensis LC
        - Dwarf multimammate mouse, Mastomys pernanus DD
      - Genus: Mus
        - Toad mouse, Mus bufo LC
        - African pygmy mouse, Mus minutoides LC
        - Thomas's pygmy mouse, Mus sorella LC
        - Gray-bellied pygmy mouse, Mus triton LC
      - Genus: Mylomys
        - African groove-toothed rat, Mylomys dybowskii LC
      - Genus: Oenomys
        - Common rufous-nosed rat, Oenomys hypoxanthus LC
      - Genus: Pelomys
        - Creek groove-toothed swamp rat, Pelomys fallax LC
        - Hopkins's groove-toothed swamp rat, Pelomys hopkinsi VU
      - Genus: Praomys
        - De Graaff's soft-furred mouse, Praomys degraaffi VU
        - Jackson's soft-furred mouse, Praomys jacksoni LC
      - Genus: Thamnomys
        - Kemp's thicket rat, Thamnomys kempi VU
        - Charming thicket rat, Thamnomys venustus NT
      - Genus: Zelotomys
        - Hildegarde's broad-headed mouse, Zelotomys hildegardeae LC

== Order: Lagomorpha (lagomorphs) ==
The lagomorphs comprise two families, Leporidae (hares and rabbits) and Ochotonidae (pikas). Though they can resemble rodents and were classified as a superfamily in that order until the early 20th century, they have since been considered a separate order. They differ from rodents in a number of physical characteristics, such as having four incisors in the upper jaw rather than two.

- Family: Leporidae (rabbits, hares)
  - Genus: Poelagus
    - Bunyoro rabbit, Poelagus marjorita LR/lc
  - Genus: Lepus
    - Cape hare, Lepus capensis LR/lc
    - African savanna hare, Lepus microtis LR/lc

== Order: Erinaceomorpha (hedgehogs and gymnures) ==
The order Erinaceomorpha contains a single family, Erinaceidae, which comprise the hedgehogs and gymnures. The hedgehogs are easily recognised by their spines while gymnures look more like large rats.

- Family: Erinaceidae (hedgehogs)
  - Subfamily: Erinaceinae
    - Genus: Atelerix
      - Four-toed hedgehog, Atelerix albiventris LR/lc

== Order: Soricomorpha (shrews, moles, and solenodons) ==
The "shrew-forms" are insectivorous mammals. The shrews and solenodons closely resemble mice while the moles are stout-bodied burrowers.

- Family: Soricidae (shrews)
  - Subfamily: Crocidurinae
    - Genus: Crocidura
      - Bicolored musk shrew, Crocidura fuscomurina LC
      - Hildegarde's shrew, Crocidura hildegardeae LC
      - Jackson's shrew, Crocidura jacksoni LC
      - Kivu long-haired shrew, Crocidura lanosa VU
      - Moonshine shrew, Crocidura luna LC
      - African black shrew, Crocidura nigrofusca LC
      - Small-footed shrew, Crocidura parvipes LC
      - Roosevelt's shrew, Crocidura roosevelti LC
      - Turbo shrew, Crocidura turba LC
    - Genus: Paracrocidura
      - Greater large-headed shrew, Paracrocidura maxima NT
    - Genus: Ruwenzorisorex
      - Ruwenzori shrew, Ruwenzorisorex suncoides VU
    - Genus: Scutisorex
      - Armored shrew, Scutisorex somereni LC
    - Genus: Sylvisorex
      - Grant's forest shrew, Sylvisorex granti LC
      - Johnston's forest shrew, Sylvisorex johnstoni LC
      - Moon forest shrew, Sylvisorex lunaris LC
      - Climbing shrew, Sylvisorex megalura LC
      - Volcano shrew, Sylvisorex vulcanorum LC

== Order: Chiroptera (bats) ==
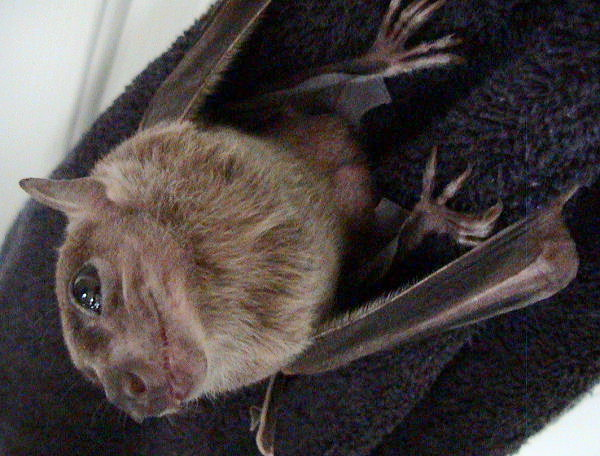
Egyptian fruit bat

The bats' most distinguishing feature is that their forelimbs are developed as wings, making them the only mammals capable of flight. Bat species account for about 20% of all mammals.

- Family: Pteropodidae (flying foxes, Old World fruit bats)
  - Subfamily: Pteropodinae
    - Genus: Eidolon
      - Straw-coloured fruit bat, Eidolon helvum LC
    - Genus: Epomophorus
      - Ethiopian epauletted fruit bat, Epomophorus labiatus LC
      - Wahlberg's epauletted fruit bat, Epomophorus wahlbergi LC
    - Genus: Epomops
      - Dobson's epauletted fruit bat, Epomops dobsoni LC
      - Franquet's epauletted fruit bat, Epomops franqueti LC
    - Genus: Lissonycteris
      - Angolan rousette, Lissonycteris angolensis LC
    - Genus: Micropteropus
      - Peters's dwarf epauletted fruit bat, Micropteropus pusillus LC
    - Genus: Myonycteris
      - Little collared fruit bat, Myonycteris torquata LC
    - Genus: Rousettus
      - Egyptian fruit bat, Rousettus aegyptiacus LC
      - Long-haired rousette, Rousettus lanosus LC
- Family: Vespertilionidae
  - Subfamily: Myotinae
    - Genus: Myotis
      - Rufous mouse-eared bat, Myotis bocagii LC
      - Cape hairy bat, Myotis tricolor LC
      - Welwitsch's bat, Myotis welwitschii LC
  - Subfamily: Vespertilioninae
    - Genus: Glauconycteris
      - Silvered bat, Glauconycteris argentata LC
      - Butterfly bat, Glauconycteris variegata LC
    - Genus: Neoromicia
      - Banana pipistrelle, Neoromicia nanus LC
      - Rendall's serotine, Neoromicia rendalli LC
      - Somali serotine, Neoromicia somalicus LC
      - White-winged serotine, Neoromicia tenuipinnis LC
    - Genus: Pipistrellus
      - Rüppell's pipistrelle, Pipistrellus rueppelli LC
    - Genus: Scotophilus
      - African yellow bat, Scotophilus dinganii LC
      - Nut-colored yellow bat, Scotophilus nux LC
  - Subfamily: Miniopterinae
    - Genus: Miniopterus
      - Lesser long-fingered bat, Miniopterus fraterculus LC
      - Greater long-fingered bat, Miniopterus inflatus LC
- Family: Molossidae
  - Genus: Chaerephon
    - Gland-tailed free-tailed bat, Chaerephon bemmeleni LC
    - Spotted free-tailed bat, Chaerephon bivittata LC
    - Little free-tailed bat, Chaerephon pumila LC
  - Genus: Mops
    - Angolan free-tailed bat, Mops condylurus LC
    - Midas free-tailed bat, Mops midas LC
    - Railer bat, Mops thersites LC
  - Genus: Otomops
    - Large-eared free-tailed bat, Otomops martiensseni NT
  - Genus: Tadarida
    - Madagascan large free-tailed bat, Tadarida fulminans LC
- Family: Nycteridae
  - Genus: Nycteris
    - Bate's slit-faced bat, Nycteris arge LC
    - Hairy slit-faced bat, Nycteris hispida LC
    - Large-eared slit-faced bat, Nycteris macrotis LC
    - Dwarf slit-faced bat, Nycteris nana LC
    - Egyptian slit-faced bat, Nycteris thebaica LC
- Family: Megadermatidae
  - Genus: Lavia
    - Yellow-winged bat, Lavia frons LC
- Family: Rhinolophidae
  - Subfamily: Rhinolophinae
    - Genus: Rhinolophus
      - Geoffroy's horseshoe bat, Rhinolophus clivosus LC
      - Eloquent horseshoe bat, Rhinolophus eloquens DD
      - Rüppell's horseshoe bat, Rhinolophus fumigatus LC
      - Hildebrandt's horseshoe bat, Rhinolophus hildebrandti LC
      - Hill's horseshoe bat, Rhinolophus hilli CR
      - Lander's horseshoe bat, Rhinolophus landeri LC
      - Ruwenzori horseshoe bat, Rhinolophus ruwenzorii VU
  - Subfamily: Hipposiderinae
    - Genus: Hipposideros
      - Sundevall's roundleaf bat, Hipposideros caffer LC
      - Cyclops roundleaf bat, Hipposideros cyclops LC
      - Noack's roundleaf bat, Hipposideros ruber LC

== Order: Pholidota (pangolins) ==
The order Pholidota comprises the eight species of pangolin. Pangolins are anteaters and have the powerful claws, elongated snout and long tongue seen in the other unrelated anteater species.

- Family: Manidae
  - Genus: Manis
    - Giant pangolin, Manis gigantea LR/lc
    - Ground pangolin, Manis temminckii LR/nt
    - Long-tailed pangolin, Manis tetradactyla LR/lc

== Order: Carnivora (carnivorans) ==
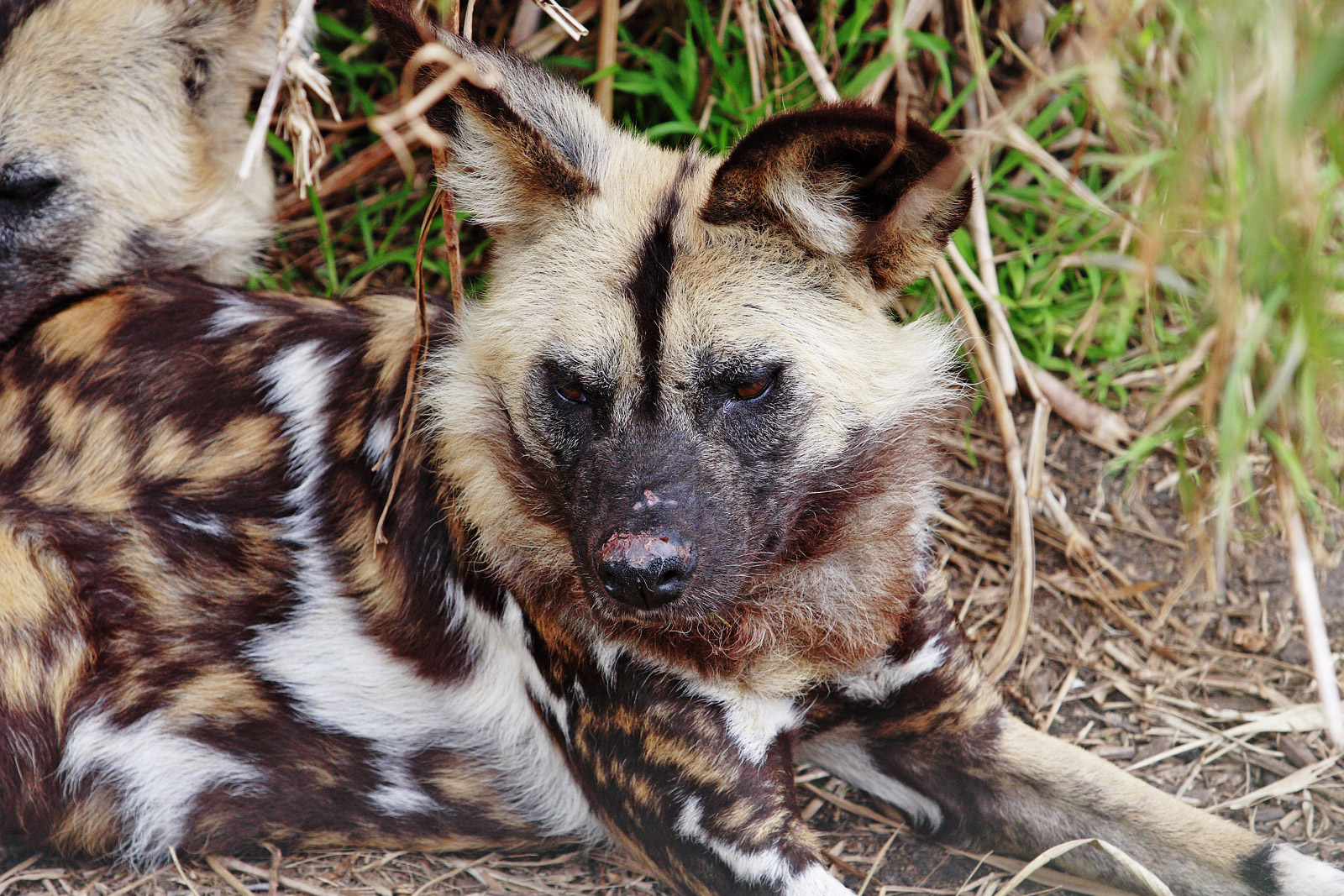
African wild dog

There are over 260 species of carnivorans, the majority of which feed primarily on meat. They have a characteristic skull shape and dentition.

- Suborder: Feliformia
  - Family: Felidae (cats)
    - Subfamily: Felinae
      - Genus: Leptailurus
        - Serval, L. serval LC
      - Genus: Caracal
        - African golden cat, C. aurata VU presence uncertain
    - Subfamily: Pantherinae
      - Genus: Panthera
        - Leopard, Panthera pardus VU
          - African leopard, P. p. pardus
        - Lion, Panthera leo VU
  - Family: Viverridae
    - Subfamily: Viverrinae
      - Genus: Civettictis
        - African civet, Civettictis civetta LC
  - Family: Nandiniidae
    - Genus: Nandinia
      - African palm civet, Nandinia binotata LC
  - Family: Herpestidae (mongooses)
    - Genus: Atilax
      - Marsh mongoose, Atilax paludinosus LC
    - Genus: Herpestes
      - Egyptian mongoose, Herpestes ichneumon LC
      - Common slender mongoose, Herpestes sanguineus LC
    - Genus: Mungos
      - Banded mongoose, Mungos mungo LC
  - Family: Hyaenidae (hyaenas)
    - Genus: Crocuta
      - Spotted hyena, Crocuta crocuta LC
- Suborder: Caniformia
  - Family: Canidae (dogs, foxes)
    - Genus: Lupulella
      - Side-striped jackal, L. adusta LC
    - Genus: Lycaon
      - African wild dog, L. pictus EN extirpated
  - Family: Mustelidae (mustelids)
    - Genus: Ictonyx
      - Striped polecat, Ictonyx striatus LC
    - Genus: Poecilogale
      - African striped weasel, Poecilogale albinucha LC
    - Genus: Mellivora
      - Honey badger, Mellivora capensis LC
    - Genus: Hydrictis
      - Speckle-throated otter, H. maculicollis LC
    - Genus: Aonyx
      - African clawless otter, Aonyx capensis LC
      - Congo clawless otter, Aonyx congicus NT

== Order: Perissodactyla (odd-toed ungulates) ==
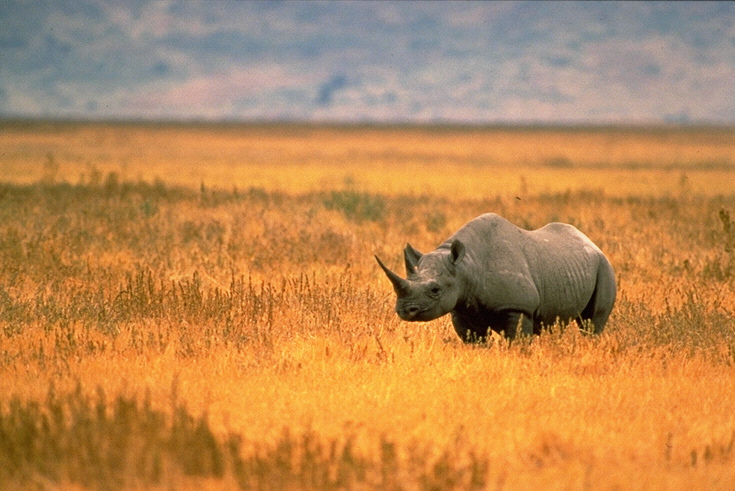
Black rhinoceros

The odd-toed ungulates are browsing and grazing mammals. They are usually large to very large and have relatively simple stomachs and a large middle toe.

- Family: Equidae (horses etc.)
  - Genus: Equus
    - Grant's zebra, Equus quagga boehmi NT
- Family: Rhinocerotidae
  - Genus: Ceratotherium
    - Southern white rhinoceros, Ceratotherium simum simum NT
  - Genus: Diceros
    - Eastern black rhinoceros, Diceros bicornis michaeli CR

== Order: Artiodactyla (even-toed ungulates) ==
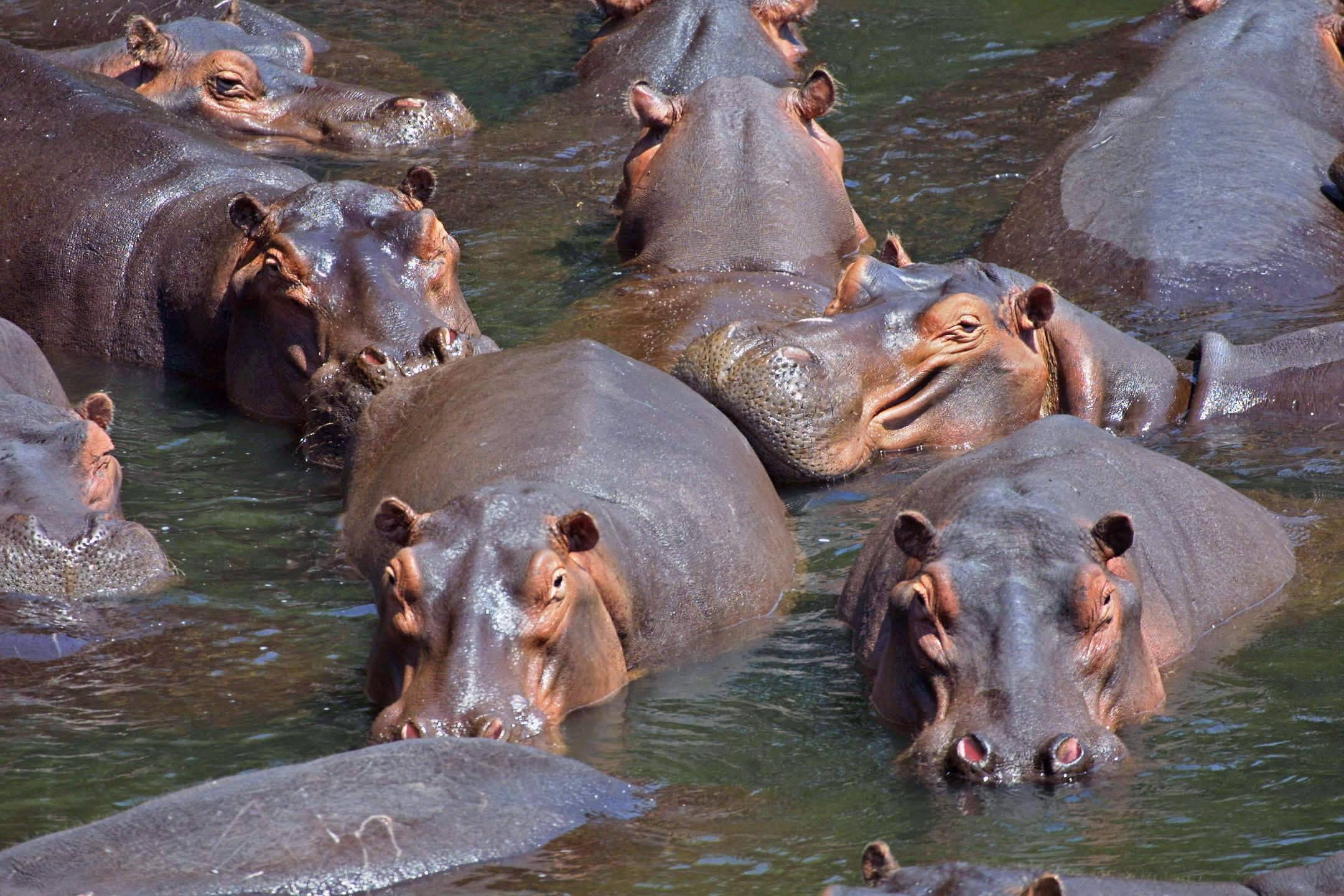
Hippopotamus

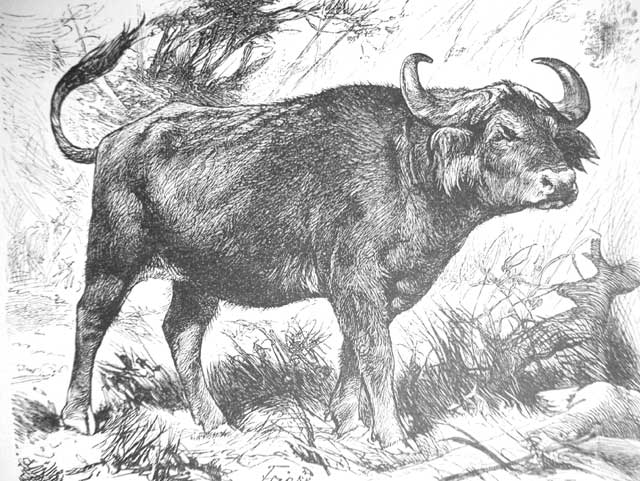
African buffalo

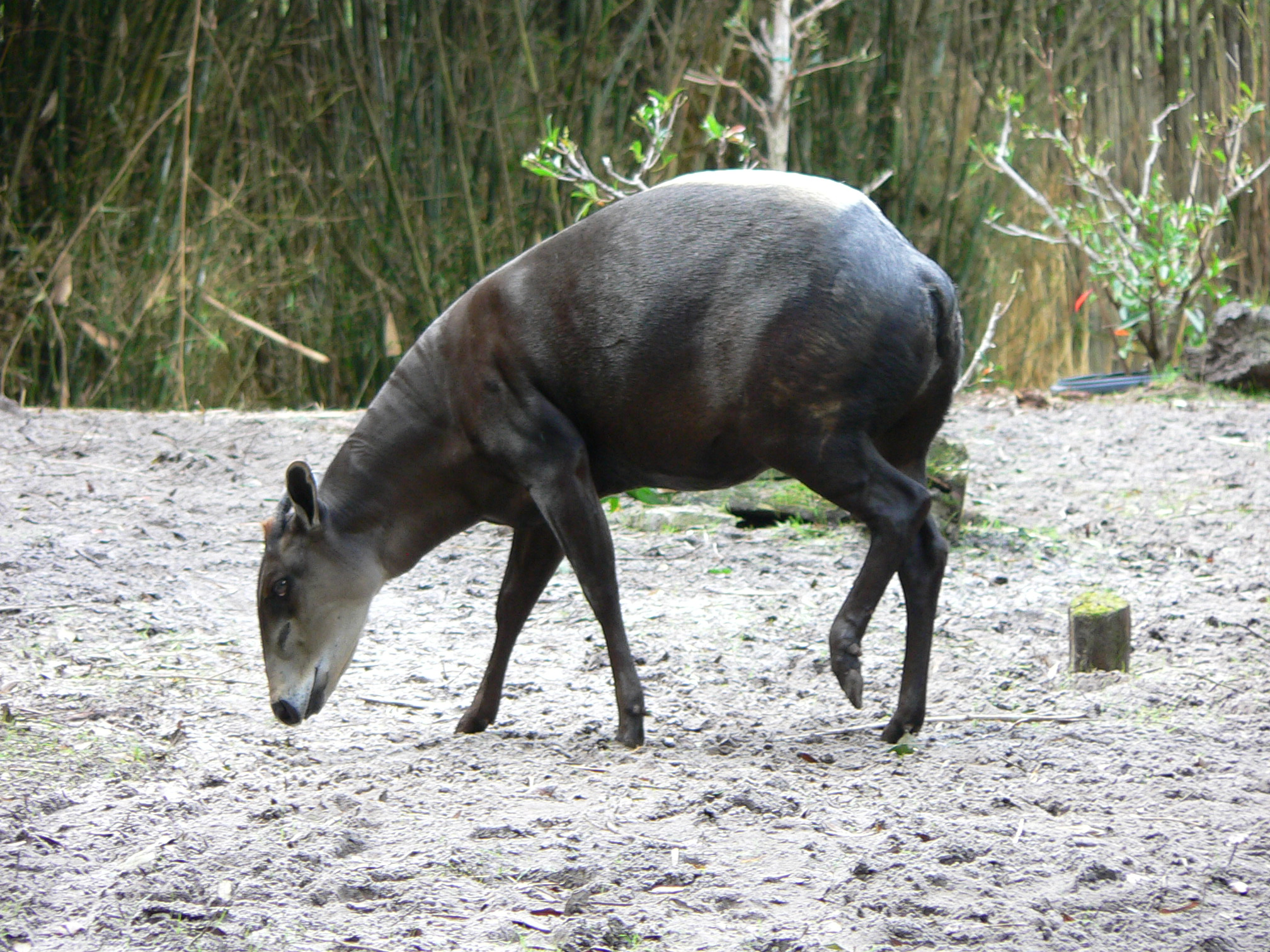
Yellow-backed duiker

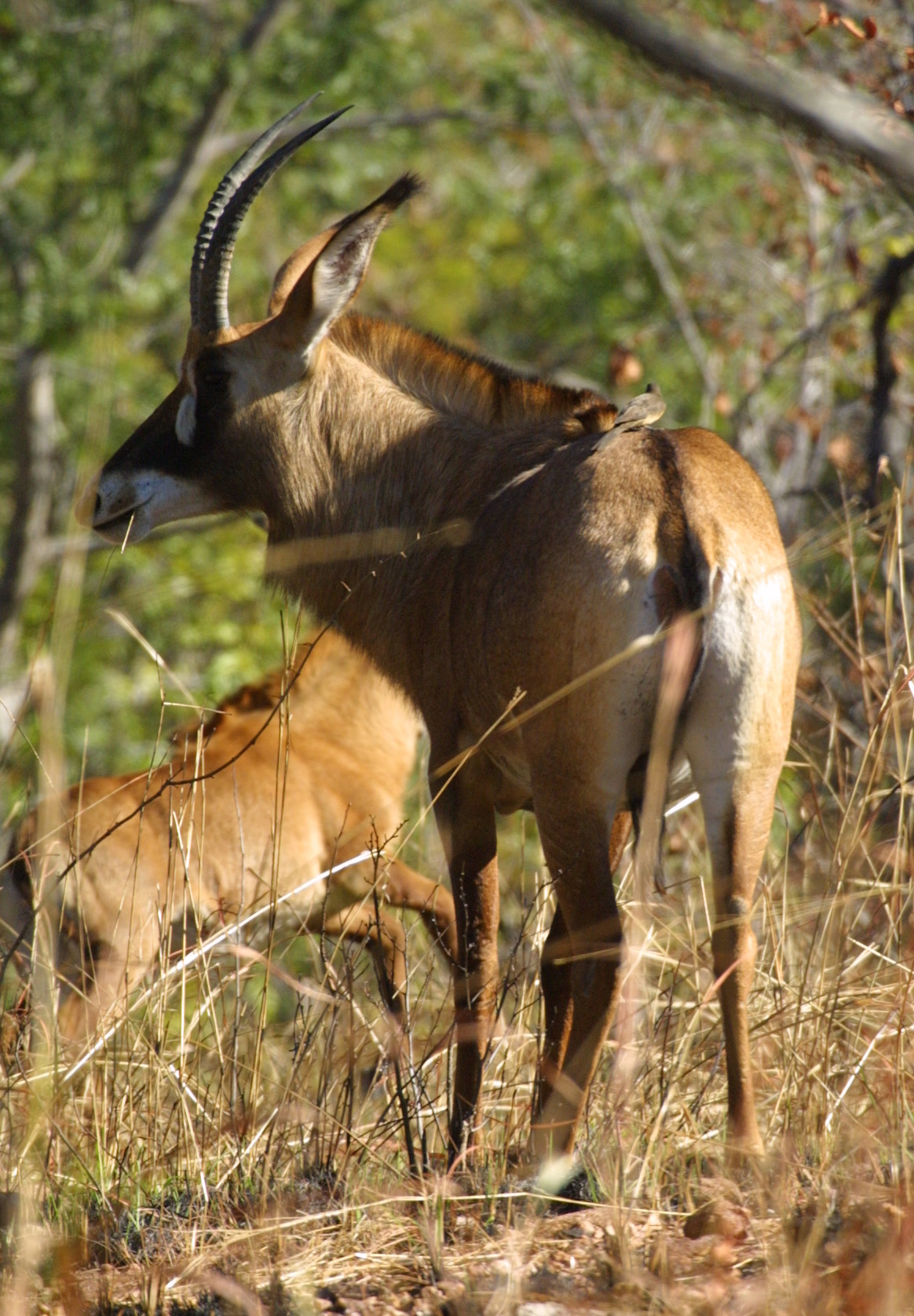
Roan antelope

The even-toed ungulates are ungulates whose weight is borne about equally by the third and fourth toes, rather than mostly or entirely by the third as in perissodactyls. There are about 220 artiodactyl species, including many that are of great economic importance to humans.

- Family: Suidae (pigs)
  - Subfamily: Phacochoerinae
    - Genus: Phacochoerus
      - Common warthog, Phacochoerus africanus LR/lc
  - Subfamily: Suinae
    - Genus: Hylochoerus
      - Giant forest hog, Hylochoerus meinertzhageni LR/lc
    - Genus: Potamochoerus
      - Bushpig, Potamochoerus larvatus LR/lc
- Family: Hippopotamidae (hippopotamuses)
  - Genus: Hippopotamus
    - Hippopotamus, H. amphibius VU
- Family: Giraffidae (giraffes and okapis)
  - Genus: Giraffa
    - Giraffe, Giraffa camelopardalis VU introduced
- Family: Tragulidae
  - Genus: Hyemoschus
    - Water chevrotain, Hyemoschus aquaticus DD
- Family: Bovidae (cattle, antelope, sheep, goats)
  - Subfamily: Alcelaphinae
    - Genus: Damaliscus
      - Topi, Damaliscus lunatus LR/cd
  - Subfamily: Antilopinae
    - Genus: Oreotragus
      - Klipspringer, Oreotragus oreotragus LR/cd
    - Genus: Ourebia
      - Oribi, Ourebia ourebi LR/cd
  - Subfamily: Bovinae
    - Genus: Syncerus
      - African buffalo, Syncerus caffer LR/cd
    - Genus: Tragelaphus
      - Common eland, Tragelaphus oryx LR/cd
      - Bushbuck, Tragelaphus scriptus LR/lc
      - Sitatunga, Tragelaphus spekii LR/nt
  - Subfamily: Cephalophinae
    - Genus: Cephalophus
      - Peters's duiker, Cephalophus callipygus LR/nt
      - Blue duiker, Cephalophus monticola LR/lc
      - Black-fronted duiker, Cephalophus nigrifrons LR/nt
      - Yellow-backed duiker, Cephalophus silvicultor LR/nt
      - Weyns's duiker, Cephalophus weynsi LR/nt
    - Genus: Sylvicapra
      - Common duiker, Sylvicapra grimmia LR/lc
  - Subfamily: Hippotraginae
    - Genus: Hippotragus
      - Roan antelope, Hippotragus equinus LR/cd
  - Subfamily: Aepycerotinae
    - Genus: Aepyceros
      - Impala, Aepyceros melampus LR/cd
  - Subfamily: Reduncinae
    - Genus: Kobus
      - Waterbuck, Kobus ellipsiprymnus LR/cd
    - Genus: Redunca
      - Bohor reedbuck, Redunca redunca LR/cd

== See also ==
- List of birds of Rwanda
- List of moths of Rwanda
- List of butterflies of Rwanda
