= Forest shrew =

Forest shrew may refer to various genera and species of shrews:

== Genus Sylvisorex (forest shrews) ==
- Forest shrews, the generic common name (in the plural) for genus Sylvisorex
  - Cameroonian forest shrew (S. cameruniensis)
  - Grant's forest shrew (S. granti)
  - Howell's forest shrew (S. howelli)
  - Bioko forest shrew (S. isabellae)
  - Johnston's forest shrew (S. johnstoni)
  - Moon forest shrew (S. lunaris)
  - Mount Cameroon forest shrew (S. morio)
  - Greater forest shrew (S. ollula)
  - Lesser forest shrew (S. oriundus)
  - Rain forest shrew (S. pluvialis)
  - S. akaibei

== Genus Myosorex (mouse shrews) ==
- Forest shrew, the common name (in the singular) of M. varius
- Long-tailed forest shrew (M. longicaudatus)
- Dark-footed forest shrew, an obsolete name of the dark-footed mouse shrew (M. cafer)

== Genus Crocidura (musk shrews) ==
- Mossy forest shrew (C. musseri)
