= Corbet's forest shrew =

Conservation status
- Data Deficient (IUCN 3.1)

Scientific classification
- Kingdom: Animalia
- Phylum: Chordata
- Class: Mammalia
- Order: Eulipotyphla
- Family: Soricidae
- Genus: Sylvisorex
- Species: S. corbeti

Binomial name
- Sylvisorex corbeti Hutterer & Montermann, 2009

Species of mammal

The Corbet's forest shrew (Sylvisorex corbeti) is a species of mammal in the family Soricidae. It is known from a single specimen found in the Mambilla Plateau in Nigeria; its range likely extends into neighboring Cameroon. The specimen was found in a forest swamp, at an elevation of 1,900 metres (6,200 ft).

== Taxonomy ==
It was described in 2009 by Rainer Hutterer and Christian Montermann from specimens gathered by G. Nikolaus in 1988, which was previously identified as Sylvisorex ollula. It was named for Gordon Corbet, mammal curator of the London Natural History Museum.

== Description ==
S. corbeti is the largest species in the genus Sylvisorex. The head and body of the holotype specimen, an adult female, is 100 millimetres (3.9 in) long, with a 64 millimetres (2.5 in) tail. It weighs 30 grams (1.1 oz). It has dark brown fur, with round ears and unusually long hind feet. Hutterer and Montermann described it as having "a unique combination of characters of a terrestrial forest shrew (large body, tail of medium length, ear conch of moderate size) with those of scansorial shrews (elongated limbs)."
