= Bamenda pygmy shrew =

Conservation status
- Data Deficient (IUCN 3.1)

Scientific classification
- Kingdom: Animalia
- Phylum: Chordata
- Class: Mammalia
- Order: Eulipotyphla
- Family: Soricidae
- Genus: Sylvisorex
- Species: S. silvanorum

Binomial name
- Sylvisorex silvanorum (Hutterer, Riegert & Sedláček, 2009)

Species of mammal

The Bamenda pygmy shrew (Sylvisorex silvanorum) is a terrestrial species of shrew described by Hutterer, Riegert and Sedláček in 2009. It was first discovered during a Museum Koenig expedition to the Bamenda Highlands of Cameroon in 1974, but was not recorded again until 2001, when partial skull remnants were located in the pellets of the endemic African grass owl.

== Description ==
A relatively small species, the Bamenda pygmy shrew measures 5.2 centimetres (2.0 in) in body length, with a tail length of around 4.4 centimetres (1.7 in). The shrew is primarily dark brown in colour, with a slightly lighter patch on the stomach. The species is distinguishable from other endemic varieties due to its comparatively reduced proportions and diminutive cranial size. It is possible that the shrew is sister taxa with the Volcano shrew, found in the Albertine Rift, as the pair share numerous characteristics and features.

== Distribution and habitat ==
The species are known to be endemic to a pair of caldera craters found near Bamenda, known as the Bafut Ngemba Forest Reserve. The lower crater contains the remnants of a past lake, while the previously flooded upper crater contains a wet grassland. The montane forests surrounding the former appears to be the primary habitat, in addition to adjacent bamboo enclaves and grasslands. The holotype of the shrew was located in dense undergrowth near a stream, suggesting that the population nearby is likely to greater in prevalence in this specific locality.
