= Horáček's horseshoe bat =

Scientific classification
- Kingdom: Animalia
- Phylum: Chordata
- Class: Mammalia
- Order: Chiroptera
- Family: Rhinolophidae
- Genus: Rhinolophus
- Species: R. horaceki

Binomial name
- Rhinolophus horaceki Benda and Vallo, 2012

Species of bat

The Horáček's horseshoe bat (Rhinolophus horaceki) is a species of bat in the family Rhinolophidae, which is endemic to Cyrenaica, Libya.

Previously, populations of these bats were attributed to Rhinolophus clivosus. They were differentiated in 2012.

== Diet and Habitat ==
Horáček's horseshoe bat occupies mainly Mediterranean steppes and deciduous woodlands, from sea level to 660m above sea level. They roost in natural caves, as well as man-made structures such as cellars and castles.

Stomach and fecal samples indicate they eat mainly medium-sized moths, having similar foraging patterns to Greater Horseshoe bats and Geoffrey's Horseshoe bat. They form small groups or roost alone, but have also been found in larger colonies as well.
