= Rain forest shrew =

Conservation status
- Data Deficient (IUCN 3.1)

Scientific classification
- Kingdom: Animalia
- Phylum: Chordata
- Class: Mammalia
- Order: Eulipotyphla
- Family: Soricidae
- Genus: Sylvisorex
- Species: S. pluvialis

Binomial name
- Sylvisorex pluvialis Hutterer & Schlitter, 1996
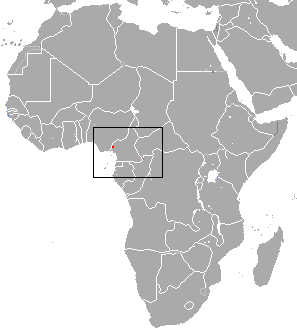
- Rain forest shrew range

Species of mammal

The rain forest shrew (Sylvisorex pluvialis) is a species of mammal in the family Soricidae endemic to Cameroon. Its natural habitat is subtropical or tropical moist lowland forest. It is known only from its type locality, and from Kongana, Central African Republic.

The Type locality of the species is the Ikenge Research Station in Cameroon at 160 m (520 ft) elevation.
