= Howell's forest shrew =

Conservation status
- Least Concern (IUCN 3.1)

Scientific classification
- Kingdom: Animalia
- Phylum: Chordata
- Class: Mammalia
- Order: Eulipotyphla
- Family: Soricidae
- Genus: Sylvisorex
- Species: S. howelli

Binomial name
- Sylvisorex howelli Jenkins, 1984
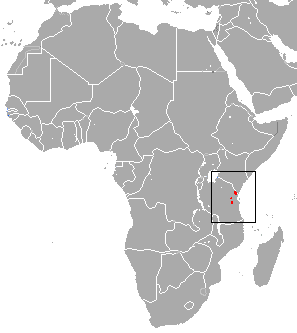
- Howell's forest shrew range

Species of mammal

Howell's forest shrew (Sylvisorex howelli) is a species of mammal in the family Soricidae. It is endemic to Tanzania. Its natural habitat is subtropical or tropical moist montane forests.
