= Bioko forest shrew =

Conservation status
- Vulnerable (IUCN 3.1)

Scientific classification
- Kingdom: Animalia
- Phylum: Chordata
- Class: Mammalia
- Order: Eulipotyphla
- Family: Soricidae
- Genus: Sylvisorex
- Species: S. isabellae

Binomial name
- Sylvisorex isabellae Heim de Balsac, 1968
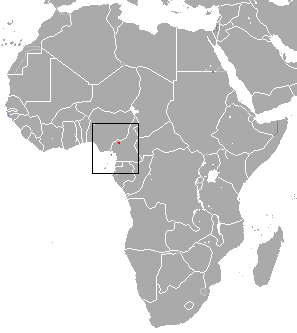
- Bioko forest shrew range

Species of mammal

The Bioko forest shrew or Isabella's shrew (Sylvisorex isabellae) is a species of mammal in the family Soricidae found in Cameroon and Equatorial Guinea. Its natural habitats are subtropical or tropical moist montane forest and subtropical or tropical high-elevation grassland.
