= Cameroonian forest shrew =

Conservation status
- Vulnerable (IUCN 3.1)

Scientific classification
- Kingdom: Animalia
- Phylum: Chordata
- Class: Mammalia
- Order: Eulipotyphla
- Family: Soricidae
- Genus: Sylvisorex
- Species: S. camerunensis

Binomial name
- Sylvisorex camerunensis Heim de Balsac, 1968
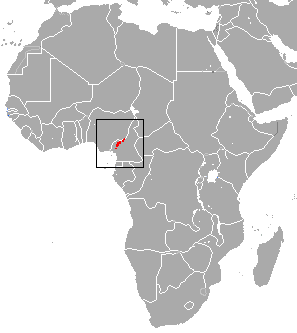
- Cameroonian forest shrew range

Species of mammal

The Cameroonian forest shrew (Sylvisorex camerunensis) is a species of mammal in the family Soricidae. It is found in the Montane forests of Western Cameroon around Mount Oku and Lake Manengouba, and in Southeastern Nigeria in the Gotel Mountains or Adamawa Plateau.

The Type locality of the species is Lake Manengouba in Cameroon at 1,800 m (5,900 ft) elevation.
