= Mount Cameroon forest shrew =

Conservation status
- Endangered (IUCN 3.1)

Scientific classification
- Kingdom: Animalia
- Phylum: Chordata
- Class: Mammalia
- Order: Eulipotyphla
- Family: Soricidae
- Genus: Sylvisorex
- Species: S. morio

Binomial name
- Sylvisorex morio (Gray, 1862)
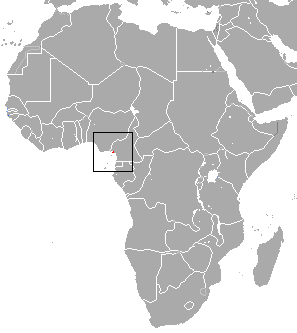
- Mount Cameroon forest shrew range

Species of mammal

The Mount Cameroon forest shrew or arrogant shrew, (Sylvisorex morio) is a species of mammal in the family Soricidae endemic to Cameroon. Its natural habitat is subtropical or tropical moist montane forests.
