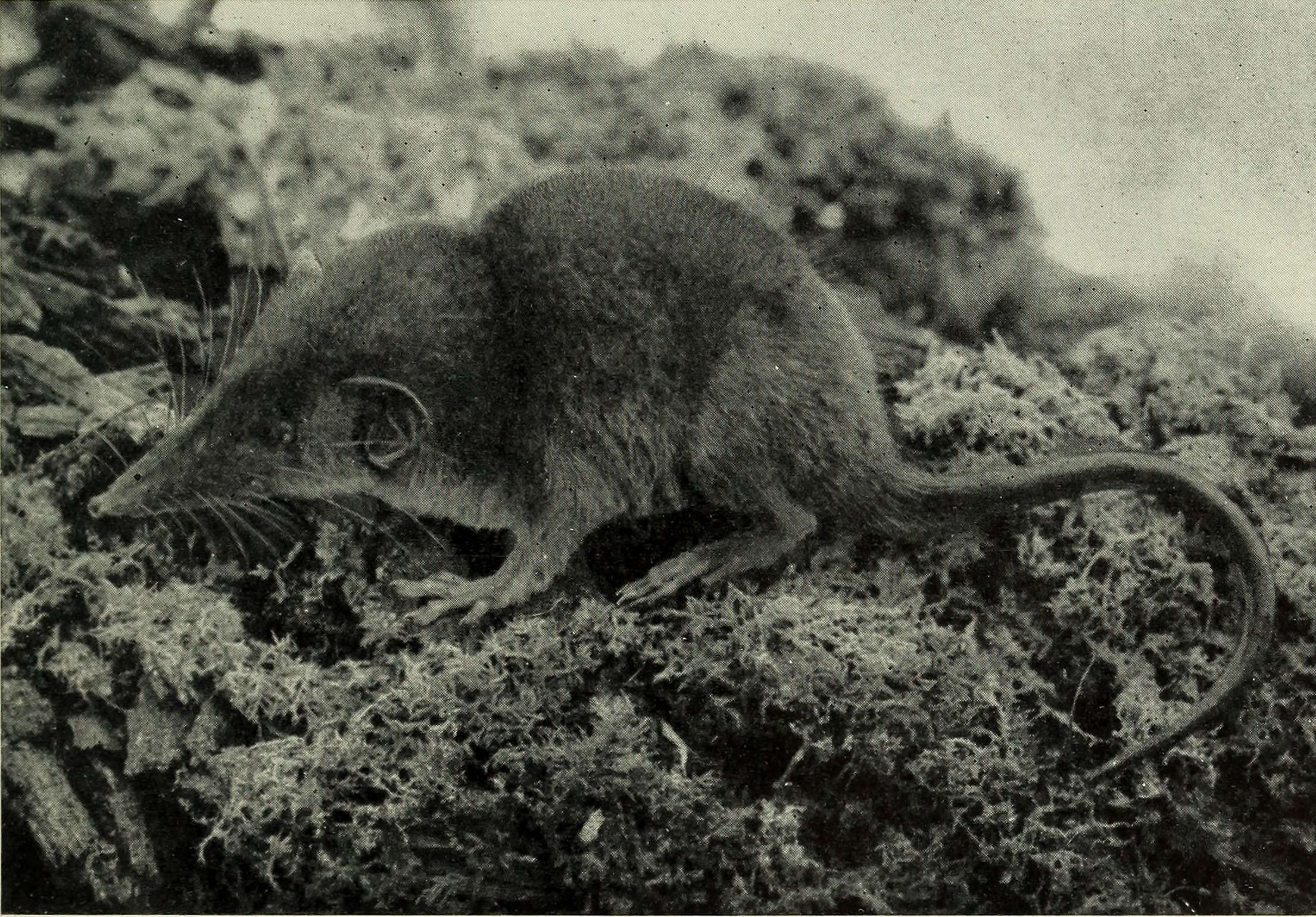
- Adult female

Conservation status
- Data Deficient (IUCN 3.1)

Scientific classification
- Kingdom: Animalia
- Phylum: Chordata
- Class: Mammalia
- Order: Eulipotyphla
- Family: Soricidae
- Genus: Sylvisorex
- Species: S. oriundus

Binomial name
- Sylvisorex oriundus Hollister, 1916
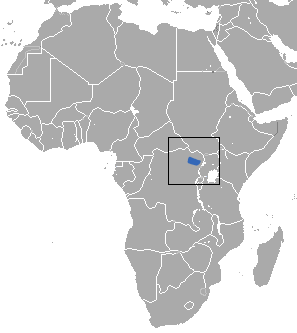
- Lesser forest shrew range

= Lesser forest shrew =

Species of mammal

The lesser forest shrew (Sylvisorex oriundus) is a species of mammal in the family Soricidae endemic to northeastern Democratic Republic of the Congo, where its type locality is at Medje. Its natural habitat is subtropical or tropical moist lowland forest.
