= Dudu Akaibe's pygmy shrew =

Conservation status
- Data Deficient (IUCN 3.1)

Scientific classification
- Kingdom: Animalia
- Phylum: Chordata
- Class: Mammalia
- Order: Eulipotyphla
- Family: Soricidae
- Genus: Sylvisorex
- Species: S. akaibei

Binomial name
- Sylvisorex akaibei Mukinzi, Hutterer & Barriere, 2009

Species of mammal

The Dudu Akaibe's pygmy shrew (Sylvisorex akaibei) is a species of mammal in the family Soricidae. It is found in the Democratic Republic of the Congo.
