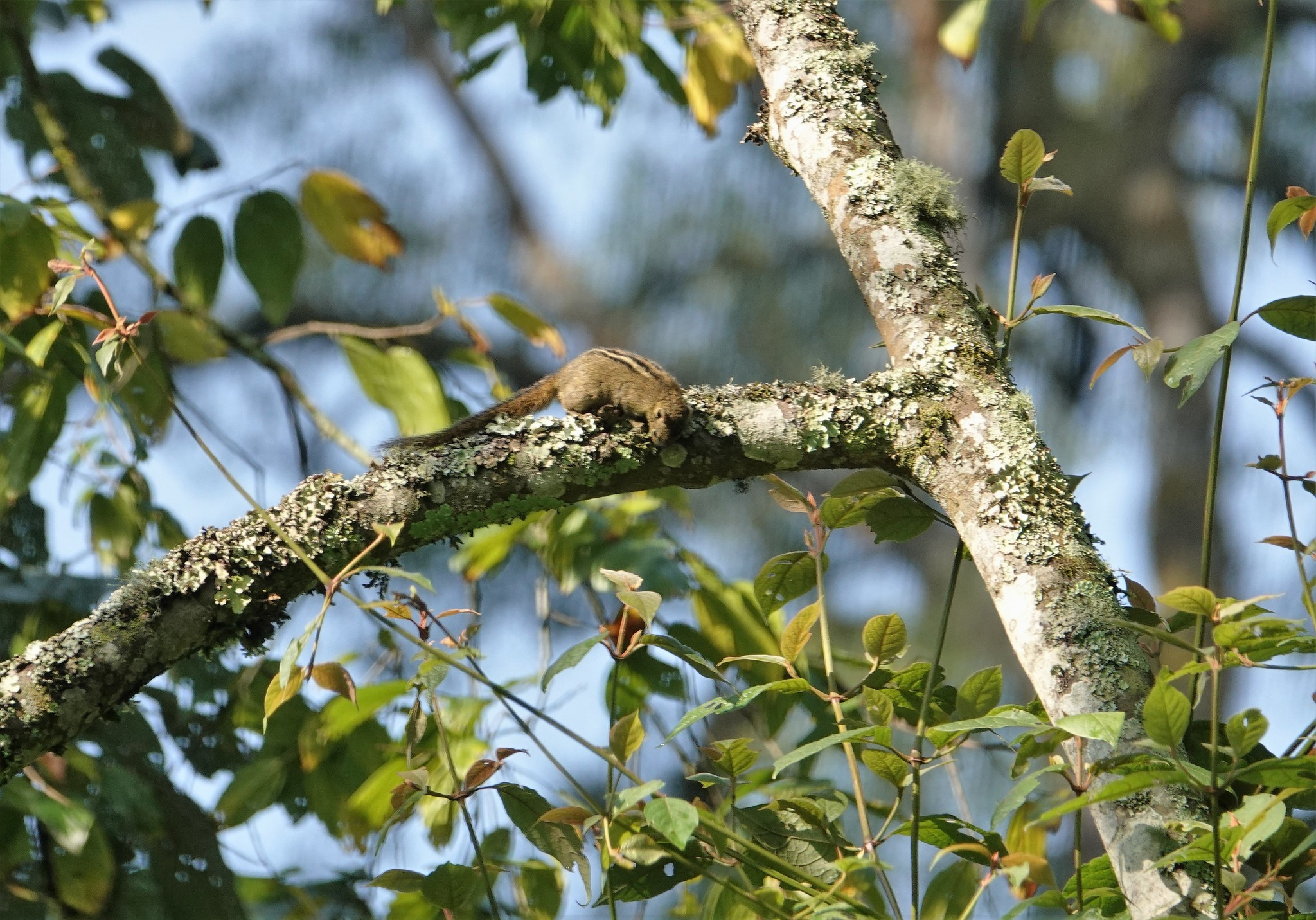

Conservation status
- Least Concern (IUCN 3.1)

Scientific classification
- Kingdom: Animalia
- Phylum: Chordata
- Class: Mammalia
- Infraclass: Placentalia
- Order: Rodentia
- Family: Sciuridae
- Genus: Paraxerus
- Species: P. boehmi

Binomial name
- Paraxerus boehmi (Reichenow, 1886)

Subspecies
- P. b. boehmi; P. b. antoniae; P. b. emini; P. b. gazellae

= Boehm's bush squirrel =

Species of rodent

Boehm's bush squirrel (Paraxerus boehmi) is a species of rodent in the family Sciuridae found in Burundi, the Democratic Republic of the Congo, Kenya, Rwanda, South Sudan, Tanzania, Uganda, and Zambia. Its natural habitats are subtropical or tropical moist lowland forest, subtropical or tropical moist montane forest, and moist savanna.
