= Greater forest shrew =

Conservation status
- Least Concern (IUCN 3.1)

Scientific classification
- Kingdom: Animalia
- Phylum: Chordata
- Class: Mammalia
- Order: Eulipotyphla
- Family: Soricidae
- Genus: Sylvisorex
- Species: S. ollula

Binomial name
- Sylvisorex ollula Thomas, 1913
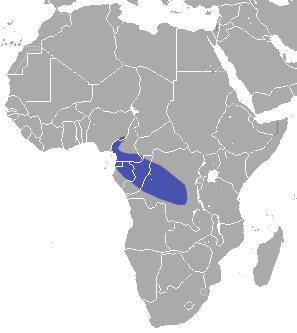
- Greater forest shrew range

Species of mammal

The greater forest shrew (Sylvisorex ollula) is a species of mammal in the family Soricidae found in Cameroon, the Central African Republic, the Republic of the Congo, Equatorial Guinea, Gabon, and Nigeria. Its natural habitat is subtropical or tropical moist lowland forest.
