= Turbo shrew =

Conservation status
- Least Concern (IUCN 3.1)

Scientific classification
- Kingdom: Animalia
- Phylum: Chordata
- Class: Mammalia
- Order: Eulipotyphla
- Family: Soricidae
- Genus: Crocidura
- Species: C. turba

Binomial name
- Crocidura turba Dollman, 1910
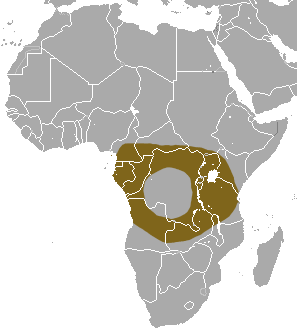
- Turbo shrew range

Species of mammal

The turbo shrew (Crocidura turba) is a species of mammal in the family Soricidae. It is found in Angola, Burundi, Cameroon, Central African Republic, Republic of the Congo, Democratic Republic of the Congo, Equatorial Guinea, Gabon, Kenya, Malawi, Rwanda, South Sudan, Tanzania, Uganda, and Zambia. Its natural habitats are subtropical or tropical moist lowland and montane forests.
