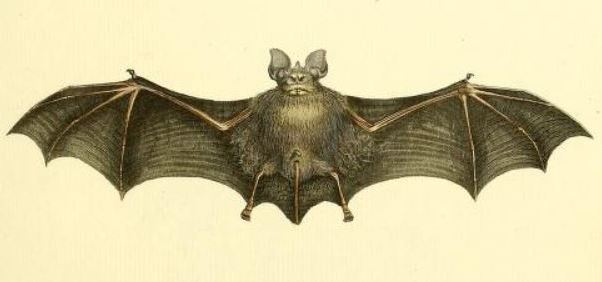

Conservation status
- Least Concern (IUCN 3.1)

Scientific classification
- Kingdom: Animalia
- Phylum: Chordata
- Class: Mammalia
- Order: Chiroptera
- Family: Rhinolophidae
- Genus: Rhinolophus
- Species: R. clivosus

Binomial name
- Rhinolophus clivosus Cretzschmar, 1828
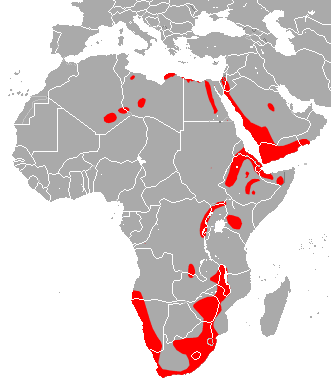
- Geoffroy's horseshoe bat range

= Geoffroy's horseshoe bat =

Species of bat

Geoffroy's horseshoe bat (Rhinolophus clivosus) is a species of bat in the family Rhinolophidae found in Africa. Its natural habitats are subtropical or tropical moist lowland forest, Mediterranean-type shrubby vegetation, caves and other subterranean habitats, and hot deserts.

== Taxonomy ==
Geoffroy's horseshoe bat was described as a new species in 1828 by German scientist Philipp Jakob Cretzschmar. The holotype was collected in Mohila, Saudi Arabia. In 2012, Rhinolophus clivosus was split into an additional species with the recognition of Rhinolophus horaceki. Further division may occur, as the same 2012 studynoted five distinct genetic lineages within R. clivosus.

== Description ==
It is considered medium-sized for an African horseshoe bat, with forearm lengths of 42–59 mm (1.7–2.3 in) and weights of 10–25 g (0.35–0.88 oz).

== Biology and ecology ==
It has one breeding season each year. Gestation length is around 3.5 months, after which one offspring is born. Differing levels of sociality have been observed. In Algeria, individuals roost alone or in small groups less than 50 individuals. In southern Africa and Malawi, however, groups of up to 10,000 individuals have been documented roosting together in a colony. Roosts are typically mixed sex, as females do not form maternity colonies to raise young.

== Range ==
Geoffroy's horseshoe bat occurs widely throughout Africa, with its range extending into the Arabian Peninsula. It is found in a variety of habitats, including desert, savanna woodland, Mediterranean shrubland, and grassland.
