= Small-footed shrew =

Conservation status
- Least Concern (IUCN 3.1)

Scientific classification
- Kingdom: Animalia
- Phylum: Chordata
- Class: Mammalia
- Order: Eulipotyphla
- Family: Soricidae
- Genus: Crocidura
- Species: C. parvipes

Binomial name
- Crocidura parvipes Osgood, 1910
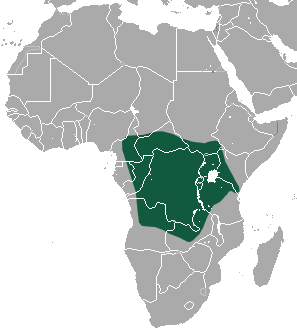
- Small-footed shrew range

Species of mammal

The small-footed shrew (Crocidura parvipes) is a species of mammal in the family Soricidae. It is found in Angola, Burundi, Cameroon, Central African Republic, Chad, Democratic Republic of the Congo, Ethiopia, Kenya, Nigeria, Rwanda, South Sudan, Tanzania, Uganda, and Zambia. Its natural habitats are subtropical or tropical moist lowland forest and shrubland.
