= Ruwenzori shrew =

Conservation status
- Vulnerable (IUCN 3.1)

Scientific classification
- Kingdom: Animalia
- Phylum: Chordata
- Class: Mammalia
- Order: Eulipotyphla
- Family: Soricidae
- Genus: Ruwenzorisorex; Hutterer, 1986
- Species: R. suncoides

Binomial name
- Ruwenzorisorex suncoides (Osgood, 1936)
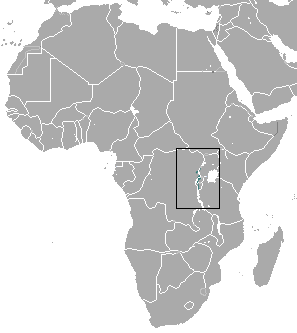
- Ruwenzori shrew range

Synonyms
- Sylvisorex suncoides

Species of mammal

The Ruwenzori shrew (Ruwenzorisorex suncoides) is a species of mammal in the family Soricidae. It is the only species within the genus Ruwenzorisorex. It is found in Burundi, Democratic Republic of the Congo, Rwanda, and Uganda. It is semiaquatic, living along streams in tropical cloud forest.
