= Jackson's shrew =

Conservation status
- Least Concern (IUCN 3.1)

Scientific classification
- Kingdom: Animalia
- Phylum: Chordata
- Class: Mammalia
- Order: Eulipotyphla
- Family: Soricidae
- Genus: Crocidura
- Species: C. jacksoni

Binomial name
- Crocidura jacksoni Thomas, 1904
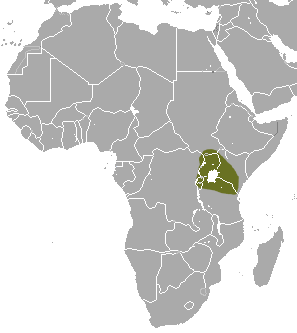
- Jackson's shrew range

Species of mammal

Jackson's shrew (Crocidura jacksoni) is a species of mammal in the family Soricidae. It is found in Burundi, Democratic Republic of the Congo, Kenya, Rwanda, South Sudan, and Uganda. Its natural habitats are subtropical or tropical moist lowland or montane forest, and heavily degraded former forest.
