= Grant's forest shrew =

Conservation status
- Least Concern (IUCN 3.1)

Scientific classification
- Kingdom: Animalia
- Phylum: Chordata
- Class: Mammalia
- Order: Eulipotyphla
- Family: Soricidae
- Genus: Sylvisorex
- Species: S. granti

Binomial name
- Sylvisorex granti Thomas, 1907
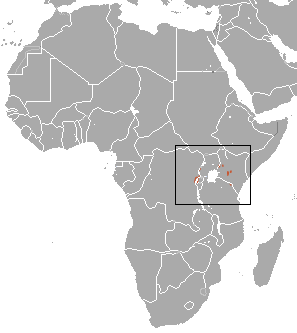
- Grant's forest shrew range

Species of mammal

Grant's forest shrew (Sylvisorex granti) is a species of mammal in the family Soricidae found in the mountain forests of central Democratic Republic of the Congo, Kenya, Rwanda, Tanzania, and Uganda. Its natural habitat is subtropical or tropical moist montane forests.

The type locality of the species is Mubuku Valley in Uganda at 10,000 ft (3,000 m) elevation.

== Subspecies ==
The identified subspecies are:

- S. g. granti, Thomas, 1907
- S. g. mundus, Osgood, 1910.
