= Moonshine shrew =

Conservation status
- Least Concern (IUCN 3.1)

Scientific classification
- Kingdom: Animalia
- Phylum: Chordata
- Class: Mammalia
- Order: Eulipotyphla
- Family: Soricidae
- Genus: Crocidura
- Species: C. luna

Binomial name
- Crocidura luna Dollman, 1910
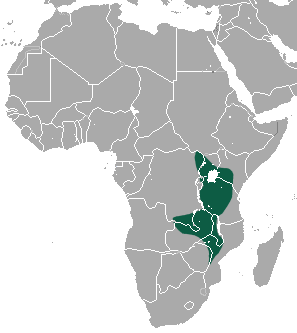
- Moonshine shrew range

Species of mammal

The moonshine shrew (Crocidura luna) is a species of mammal in the family Soricidae. It is found in Angola, Burundi, Democratic Republic of the Congo, Kenya, Malawi, Mozambique, Rwanda, Tanzania, Uganda, Zambia, and Zimbabwe. Its natural habitat is subtropical or tropical moist montane forests.
