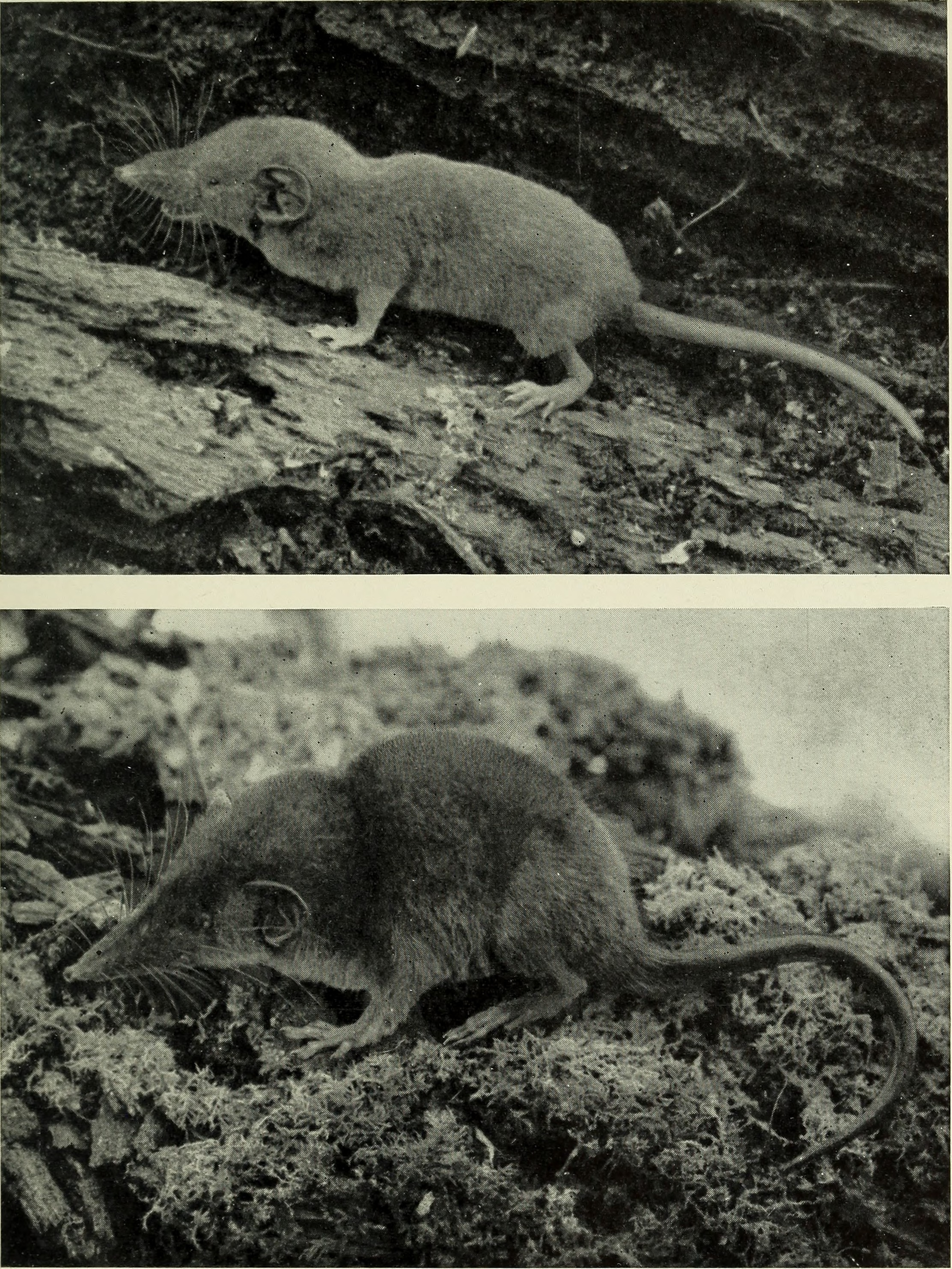
- Lesser forest shrew (Sylvisorex oriundus) (lower image)

Scientific classification
- Domain: Eukaryota
- Kingdom: Animalia
- Phylum: Chordata
- Class: Mammalia
- Order: Eulipotyphla
- Family: Soricidae
- Subfamily: Crocidurinae
- Genus: Sylvisorex; Thomas, 1904

Type species
- Crocidura morio

= Sylvisorex =

Genus of mammals

The forest shrews are the members of the genus Sylvisorex. They are mammals in the family Soricidae and are found only in Africa. The genus name comes from the Latin world "silva" which means "forest" and "sorex", which means "shrew-mouse". This reflects the nature of these shrews, which prefer forest habitats. All shrews are carnivorous, and eat continually to satisfy their high metabolic rate.

The genus contains these species:

- Akaibe's forest shrew, Sylvisorex akaibei
- Cameroonian forest shrew, Sylvisorex cameruniensis
- Corbet's forest shrew, Sylvisorex corbeti
- Grant's forest shrew, Sylvisorex granti
- Howell's forest shrew, Sylvisorex howelli
- Bioko forest shrew, Sylvisorex isabellae
- Johnston's forest shrew, Sylvisorex johnstoni
- Kongana shrew, Sylvisorex konganensis
- Moon forest shrew, Sylvisorex lunaris
- Mount Cameroon forest shrew, Sylvisorex morio
- Greater forest shrew, Sylvisorex ollula
- Lesser forest shrew, Sylvisorex oriundus
- Rain forest shrew, Sylvisorex pluvialis
- Bamenda forest shrew, Sylvisorex silvanorum
- Volcano shrew, Sylvisorex vulcanorum
