= Moon forest shrew =

Conservation status
- Near Threatened (IUCN 3.1)

Scientific classification
- Kingdom: Animalia
- Phylum: Chordata
- Class: Mammalia
- Order: Eulipotyphla
- Family: Soricidae
- Genus: Sylvisorex
- Species: S. lunaris

Binomial name
- Sylvisorex lunaris Thomas, 1906
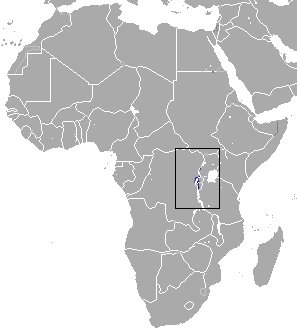
- Moon forest shrew range

Species of mammal

The moon forest shrew (Sylvisorex lunaris) is a species of mammal in the family Soricidae. It is found in Burundi, Rwanda, and Uganda. Its natural habitat is subtropical or tropical moist montane forests.
