= List of mammals of the Democratic Republic of the Congo =

This is a list of the mammal species recorded in the Democratic Republic of the Congo. Of the mammal species in the Democratic Republic of the Congo, two are critically endangered, six are endangered, twenty-one are vulnerable, and thirty-five are near threatened.

The following tags are used to highlight each species' conservation status as assessed by the International Union for Conservation of Nature:

EX	Extinct	No reasonable doubt that the last individual has died.
EW	Extinct in the wild	Known only to survive in captivity or as a naturalized populations well outside its previous range.
CR	Critically endangered	The species is in imminent risk of extinction in the wild.
EN	Endangered	The species is facing an extremely high risk of extinction in the wild.
VU	Vulnerable	The species is facing a high risk of extinction in the wild.
NT	Near threatened	The species does not meet any of the criteria that would categorise it as risking extinction but it is likely to do so in the future.
LC	Least concern	There are no current identifiable risks to the species.
DD	Data deficient	There is inadequate information to make an assessment of the risks to this species.

Some species were assessed using an earlier set of criteria. Species assessed using this system have the following instead of near threatened and least concern categories:

LR/cd	Lower risk/conservation dependent	Species which were the focus of conservation programmes and may have moved into a higher risk category if that programme was discontinued.
LR/nt	Lower risk/near threatened	Species which are close to being classified as vulnerable but are not the subject of conservation programmes.
LR/lc	Lower risk/least concern	Species for which there are no identifiable risks.

== Order: Afrosoricida (tenrecs and golden moles) ==
The order Afrosoricida contains the golden moles of southern Africa and the tenrecs of Madagascar and Africa, two families of small mammals that were traditionally part of the order Insectivora.

- Family: Tenrecidae (tenrecs)
  - Subfamily: Potamogalinae
    - Genus: Micropotamogale
      - Ruwenzori otter shrew, Micropotamogale ruwenzorii NT
    - Genus: Potamogale
      - Giant otter shrew, Potamogale velox LC
- Family: Chrysochloridae
  - Subfamily: Chrysochlorinae
    - Genus: Chrysochloris
      - Stuhlmann's golden mole, Chrysochloris stuhlmanni LC
  - Subfamily: Amblysominae
    - Genus: Calcochloris
      - Congo golden mole, Calcochloris leucorhinus DD

== Order: Macroscelidea (elephant shrews) ==
Often called sengi, the elephant shrews or jumping shrews are native to southern Africa. Their common English name derives from their elongated flexible snout and their resemblance to the true shrews.

- Family: Macroscelididae (elephant shrews)
  - Genus: Elephantulus
    - Short-snouted elephant shrew, Elephantulus brachyrhynchus LC
    - Dusky-footed elephant shrew, Elephantulus fuscipes DD
  - Genus: Petrodromus
    - Four-toed elephant shrew, Petrodromus tetradactylus LC
  - Genus: Rhynchocyon
    - Checkered elephant shrew, Rhynchocyon cirnei NT

== Order: Tubulidentata (aardvarks) ==
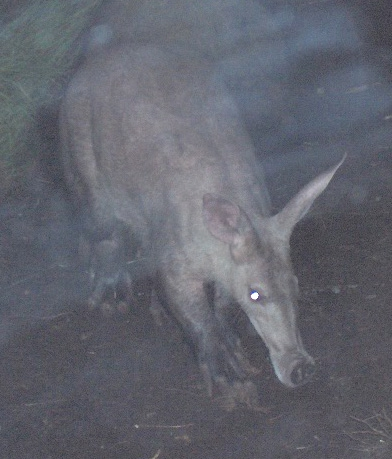
Aardvark

The order Tubulidentata consists of a single species, the aardvark. Tubulidentata are characterised by their teeth which lack a pulp cavity and form thin tubes which are continuously worn down and replaced.

- Family: Orycteropodidae
  - Genus: Orycteropus
    - Aardvark, O. afer LC

== Order: Hyracoidea (hyraxes) ==
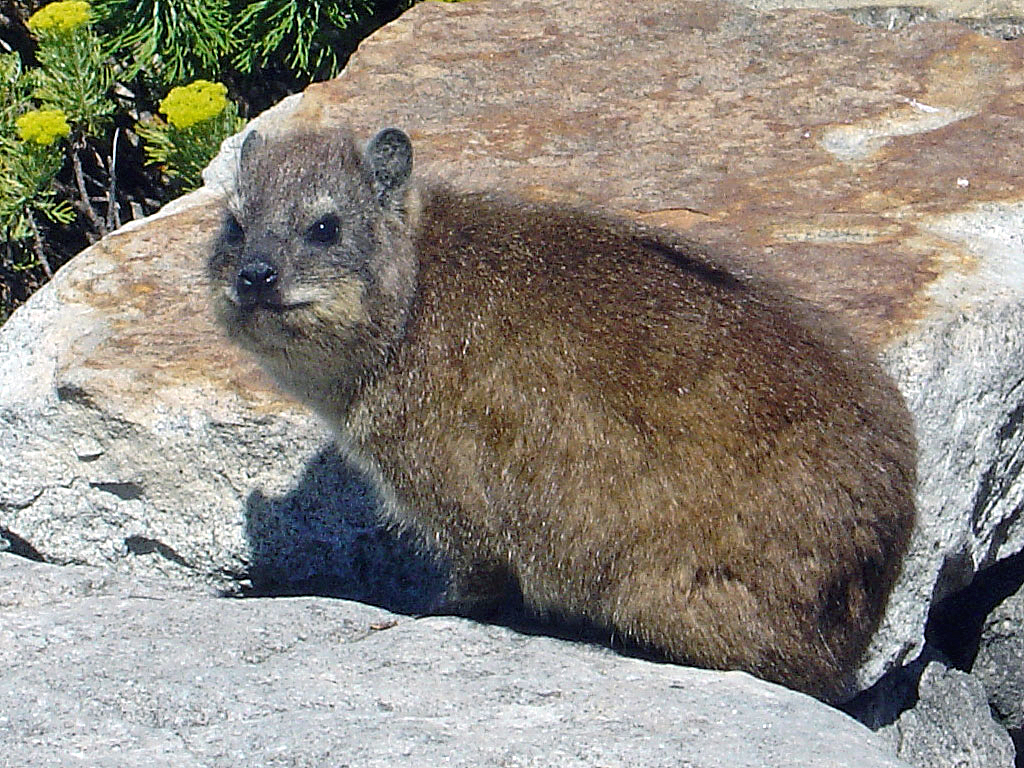
Cape hyrax

The hyraxes are any of four species of fairly small, thickset, herbivorous mammals in the order Hyracoidea. About the size of a domestic cat they are well-furred, with rounded bodies and a stumpy tail. They are native to Africa and the Middle East.

- Family: Procaviidae (hyraxes)
  - Genus: Dendrohyrax
    - Southern tree hyrax, D. arboreus LC
    - Western tree hyrax, D. dorsalis LC
      - Genus: Heterohyrax
    - Yellow-spotted rock hyrax, H. brucei LC
  - Genus: Procavia
    - Cape hyrax, P. capensis LC

== Order: Proboscidea (elephants) ==
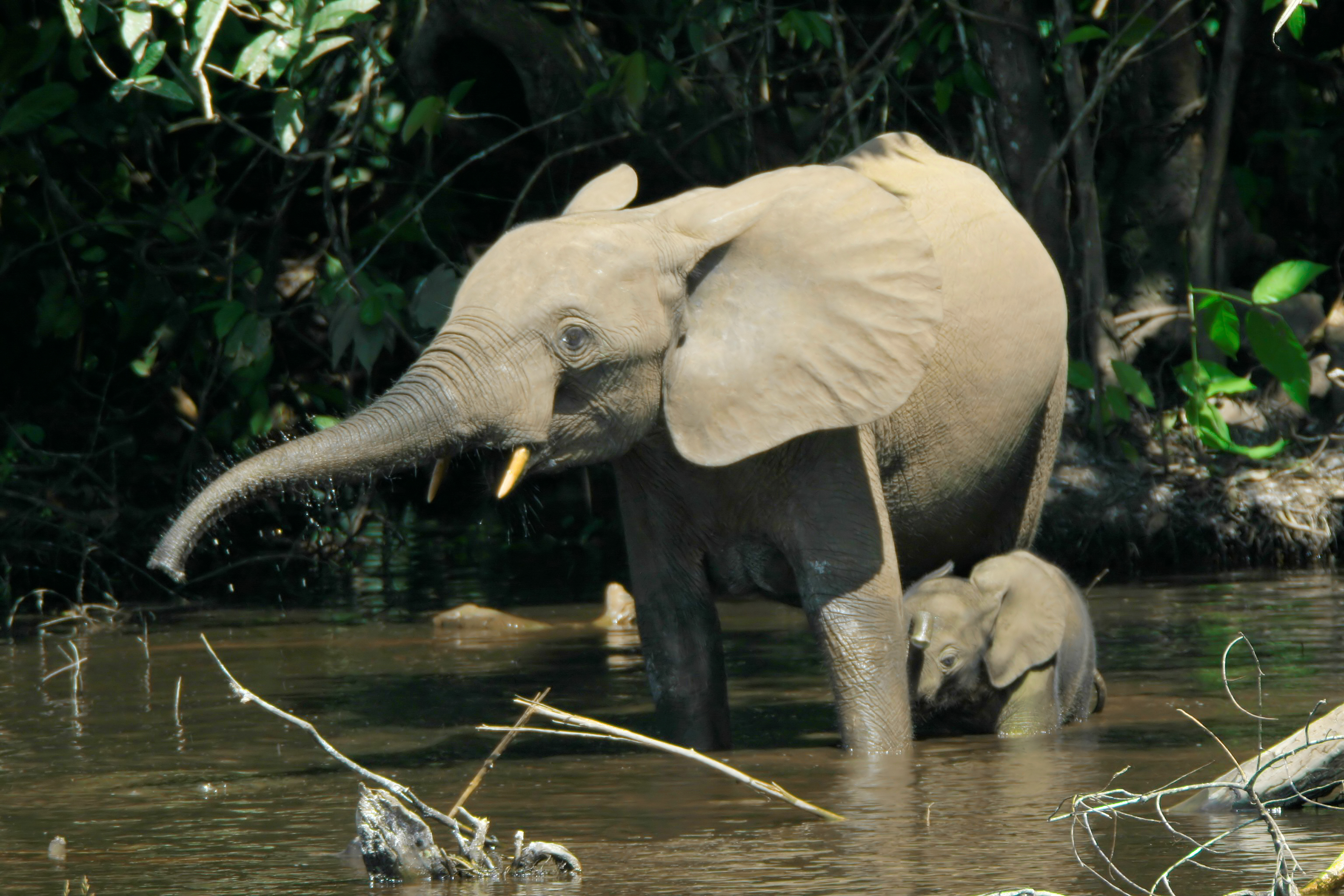
African forest elephant in the Congo Basin

The elephants comprise three living species and are the largest living land animals.

- Family: Elephantidae (elephants)
  - Genus: Loxodonta
    - African forest elephant, L. cyclotis CR
    - African bush elephant, L. africana

== Order: Sirenia (manatees and dugongs) ==
Sirenia is an order of fully aquatic, herbivorous mammals that inhabit rivers, estuaries, coastal marine waters, swamps, and marine wetlands. All four species are endangered.

- Family: Trichechidae
  - Genus: Trichechus
    - African manatee, T. senegalensis VU

== Order: Primates ==
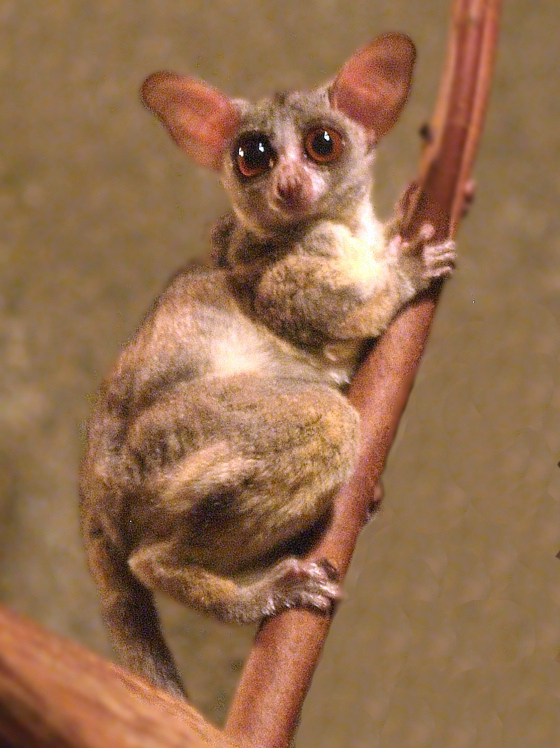
Senegal bushbaby

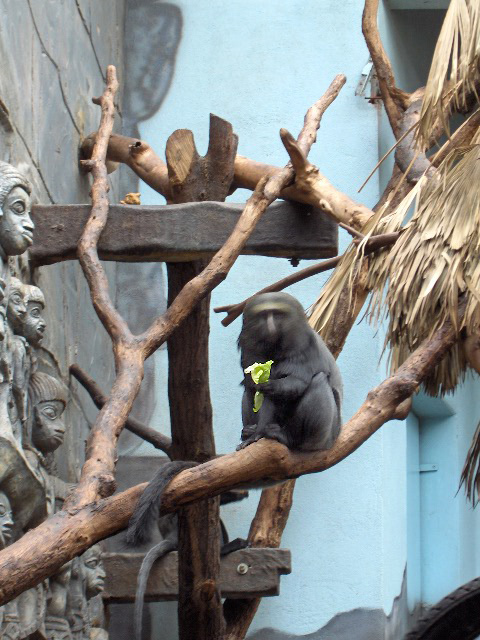
Hamlyn's monkey

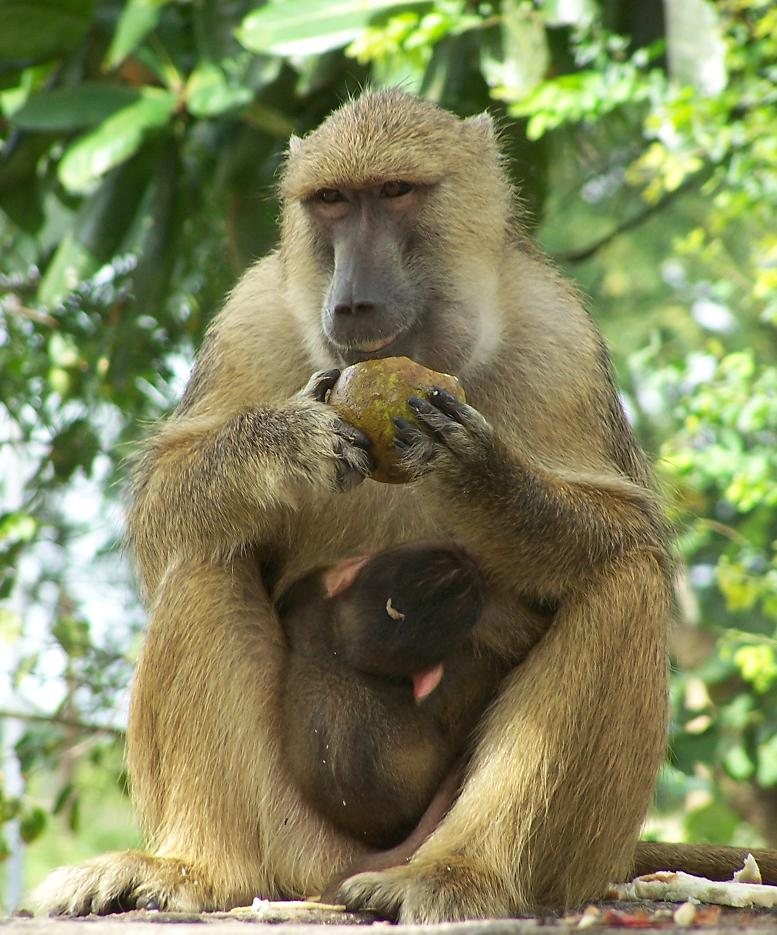
Yellow baboon

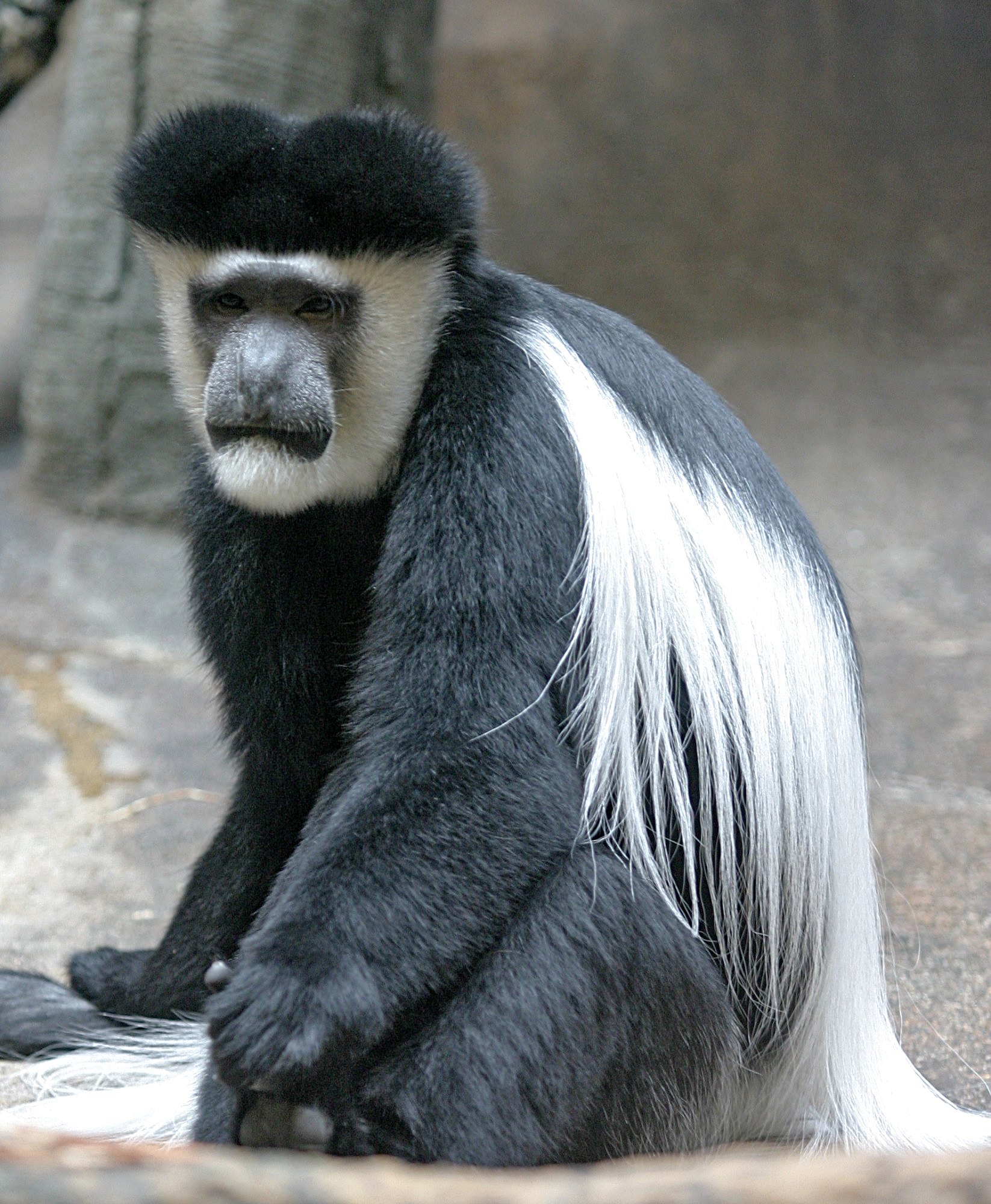
Mantled guereza

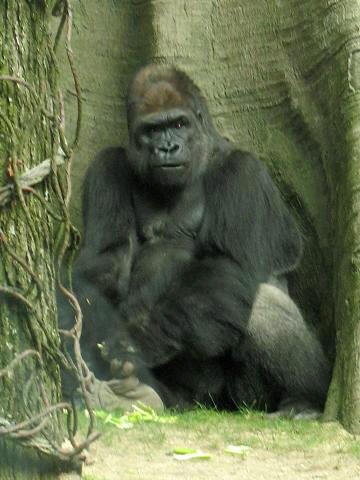
Western gorilla

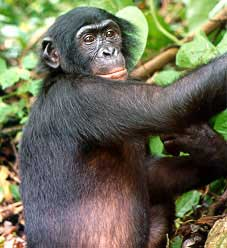
Bonobo

The order Primates contains humans and their closest relatives: lemurs, lorisoids, tarsiers, monkeys, and apes.

- Suborder: Strepsirrhini
  - Infraorder: Lemuriformes
    - Superfamily: Lorisoidea
      - Family: Lorisidae (lorises, bushbabies)
        - Genus: Arctocebus
          - Golden angwantibo, Arctocebus aureus LC
        - Genus: Perodicticus
          - Potto, Perodicticus potto LC
      - Family: Galagidae
        - Genus: Galagoides
          - Prince Demidoff's bushbaby, Galagoides demidovii LC
          - Thomas's bushbaby, Galagoides thomasi LC
        - Genus: Galago
          - Dusky bushbaby, Galago matschiei LC
          - Mohol bushbaby, Galago moholi LC
          - Senegal bushbaby, Galago senegalensis LC
        - Genus: Otolemur
          - Brown greater galago, Otolemur crassicaudatus LC
        - Genus: Euoticus
          - Southern needle-clawed bushbaby, Euoticus elegantulus LC
- Suborder: Haplorhini
  - Infraorder: Simiiformes
    - Parvorder: Catarrhini
      - Superfamily: Cercopithecoidea
        - Family: Cercopithecidae (Old World monkeys)
          - Genus: Allenopithecus
            - Allen's swamp monkey, Allenopithecus nigroviridis
          - Genus: Miopithecus
            - Angolan talapoin, Miopithecus talapoin
            - Gabon talapoin, Miopithecus ogouensis
          - Genus: Erythrocebus
            - Patas monkey, Erythrocebus patas
          - Genus: Chlorocebus
            - Tantalus monkey, Chlorocebus tantalus
            - Vervet monkey, Chlorocebus pygerythrus
            - Malbrouck, Chlorocebus cynosuros
          - Genus: Cercopithecus
            - Red-tailed monkey, Cercopithecus ascanius
            - Moustached guenon, Cercopithecus cephus
            - Dryas monkey, Cercopithecus dryas DD
            - Hamlyn's monkey, Cercopithecus hamlyni
            - L'Hoest's monkey, Cercopithecus lhoesti
            - Blue monkey, Cercopithecus mitis
            - De Brazza's monkey, Cercopithecus neglectus
            - Greater spot-nosed monkey, Cercopithecus nictitans
            - Crowned guenon, Cercopithecus pogonias
            - Lesula, Cercopithecus lomamiensis
          - Genus: Lophocebus
            - Grey-cheeked mangabey, Lophocebus albigena
            - Black crested mangabey, Lophocebus aterrimus
          - Genus: Papio
            - Olive baboon, Papio anubis LC
            - Yellow baboon, Papio cynocephalus
          - Subfamily: Colobinae
            - Genus: Colobus
              - Angola colobus, Colobus angolensis
              - Mantled guereza, Colobus guereza
              - Likweli, Colobus congoensis
      - Superfamily: Hominoidea
        - Family: Hominidae (great apes)
          - Subfamily: Homininae
            - Tribe: Gorillini
              - Genus: Gorilla
                - Mountain gorilla, Gorilla beringei beringei EN
                - Eastern lowland gorilla, Gorilla beringei graueri CE
                - Western lowland gorilla, Gorilla gorilla gorilla CE
            - Tribe: Panini
              - Genus: Pan
                - Bonobo, Pan paniscus EN
                - Common chimpanzee, Pan troglodytes EN

== Order: Rodentia (rodents) ==
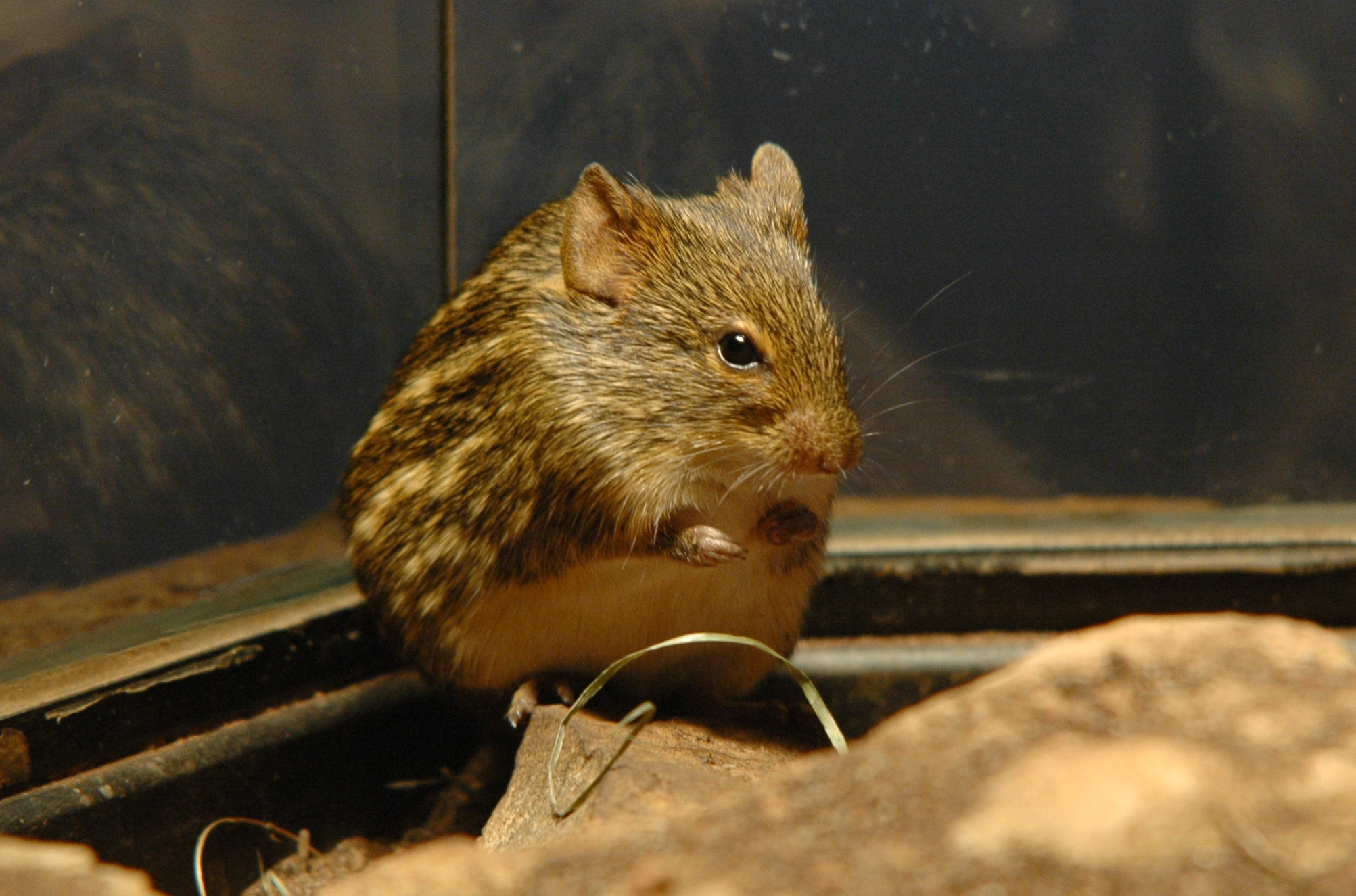
Typical striped grass mouse

Rodents make up the largest order of mammals, with over 40% of mammalian species. They have two incisors in the upper and lower jaw which grow continually and must be kept short by gnawing. Most rodents are small though the capybara can weigh up to 45 kg (99 lb).

- Suborder: Hystricognathi
  - Family: Bathyergidae
    - Genus: Cryptomys
      - Bocage's mole-rat, Cryptomys bocagei DD
      - Mechow's mole-rat, Cryptomys mechowi LC
      - Ochre mole-rat, Cryptomys ochraceocinereus DD
    - Genus: Heliophobius
      - Silvery mole-rat, Heliophobius argenteocinereus LC
  - Family: Hystricidae (Old World porcupines)
    - Genus: Atherurus
      - African brush-tailed porcupine, Atherurus africanus LC
    - Genus: Hystrix
      - Cape porcupine, Hystrix africaeaustralis LC
      - Crested porcupine, Hystrix cristata LC
  - Family: Thryonomyidae (cane rats)
    - Genus: Thryonomys
      - Lesser cane rat, Thryonomys gregorianus LC
      - Greater cane rat, Thryonomys swinderianus LC
- Suborder: Sciurognathi
  - Family: Anomaluridae
    - Subfamily: Anomalurinae
      - Genus: Anomalurus
        - Lord Derby's scaly-tailed squirrel, Anomalurus derbianus LC
        - Dwarf scaly-tailed squirrel, Anomalurus pusillus LC
      - Genus: Anomalurops
        - Beecroft's scaly-tailed squirrel, Anomalurops beecrofti LC
    - Subfamily: Zenkerellinae
      - Genus: Idiurus
        - Long-eared flying mouse, Idiurus macrotis LC
        - Flying mouse, Idiurus zenkeri DD
  - Family: Pedetidae (spring hare)
    - Genus: Pedetes
      - Springhare, Pedetes capensis LC
  - Family: Sciuridae (squirrels)
    - Subfamily: Xerinae
      - Tribe: Xerini
        - Genus: Xerus
          - Striped ground squirrel, Xerus erythropus LC
      - Tribe: Protoxerini
        - Genus: Funisciurus
          - Thomas's rope squirrel, Funisciurus anerythrus DD
          - Lunda rope squirrel, Funisciurus bayonii DD
          - Carruther's mountain squirrel, Funisciurus carruthersi LC
          - Congo rope squirrel, Funisciurus congicus LC
          - Ribboned rope squirrel, Funisciurus lemniscatus DD
          - Fire-footed rope squirrel, Funisciurus pyrropus LC
        - Genus: Heliosciurus
          - Gambian sun squirrel, Heliosciurus gambianus LC
          - Red-legged sun squirrel, Heliosciurus rufobrachium LC
          - Ruwenzori sun squirrel, Heliosciurus ruwenzorii LC
        - Genus: Paraxerus
          - Alexander's bush squirrel, Paraxerus alexandri LC
          - Boehm's bush squirrel, Paraxerus boehmi LC
          - Smith's bush squirrel, Paraxerus cepapi LC
          - Green bush squirrel, Paraxerus poensis LC
        - Genus: Protoxerus
          - Forest giant squirrel, Protoxerus stangeri LC
  - Family: Gliridae (dormice)
    - Subfamily: Graphiurinae
      - Genus: Graphiurus
        - Christy's dormouse, Graphiurus christyi DD
        - Lorrain dormouse, Graphiurus lorraineus LC
        - Monard's dormouse, Graphiurus monardi DD
        - Kellen's dormouse, Graphiurus kelleni LC
        - Silent dormouse, Graphiurus surdus DD
  - Family: Spalacidae
    - Subfamily: Tachyoryctinae
      - Genus: Tachyoryctes
        - Rwanda African mole-rat, Tachyoryctes ruandae LC
  - Family: Nesomyidae
    - Subfamily: Delanymyinae
      - Genus: Delanymys
        - Delany's swamp mouse, Delanymys brooksi EN
    - Subfamily: Dendromurinae
      - Genus: Dendromus
        - Montane African climbing mouse, Dendromus insignis LC
        - Mount Kahuzi climbing mouse, Dendromus kahuziensis CR
        - Kivu climbing mouse, Dendromus kivu LC
        - Gray climbing mouse, Dendromus melanotis LC
        - Brants's climbing mouse, Dendromus mesomelas LC
        - Banana climbing mouse, Dendromus messorius LC
        - Chestnut climbing mouse, Dendromus mystacalis LC
        - Nyika climbing mouse, Dendromus nyikae LC
      - Genus: Steatomys
        - Fat mouse, Steatomys pratensis LC
    - Subfamily: Cricetomyinae
      - Genus: Cricetomys
        - Emin's pouched rat, Cricetomys emini LC
        - Gambian pouched rat, Cricetomys gambianus LC
      - Genus: Saccostomus
        - South African pouched mouse, Saccostomus campestris LC
  - Family: Muridae (mice, rats, voles, gerbils, hamsters, etc.)
    - Subfamily: Deomyinae
      - Genus: Acomys
        - Spiny mouse, Acomys spinosissimus LC
      - Genus: Deomys
        - Link rat, Deomys ferrugineus LC
      - Genus: Lophuromys
        - Gray brush-furred rat, Lophuromys cinereus DD
        - Yellow-spotted brush-furred rat, Lophuromys flavopunctatus LC
        - Hutterer's brush-furred mouse, Lophuromys huttereri DD
        - Yellow-bellied brush-furred rat, Lophuromys luteogaster LC
        - Medium-tailed brush-furred rat, Lophuromys medicaudatus NT
        - Fire-bellied brush-furred rat, Lophuromys nudicaudus LC
        - Rahm's brush-furred rat, Lophuromys rahmi NT
        - Rusty-bellied brush-furred rat, Lophuromys sikapusi LC
        - Woosnam's brush-furred rat, Lophuromys woosnami LC
      - Genus: Uranomys
        - Rudd's mouse, Uranomys ruddi LC
    - Subfamily: Otomyinae
      - Genus: Otomys
        - Dent's vlei rat, Otomys denti NT
        - Large vlei rat, Otomys maximus LC
        - Tropical vlei rat, Otomys tropicalis LC
    - Subfamily: Gerbillinae
      - Genus: Tatera
        - Boehm's gerbil, Tatera boehmi LC
        - Kemp's gerbil, Tatera kempi LC
        - Bushveld gerbil, Tatera leucogaster LC
        - Savanna gerbil, Tatera valida LC
      - Genus: Taterillus
        - Congo gerbil, Taterillus congicus LC
        - Emin's gerbil, Taterillus emini LC
    - Subfamily: Murinae
      - Genus: Aethomys
        - Bocage's rock rat, Aethomys bocagei LC
        - Hinde's rock rat, Aethomys hindei LC
        - Kaiser's rock rat, Aethomys kaiseri LC
        - Nyika rock rat, Aethomys nyikae LC
      - Genus: Arvicanthis
        - African grass rat, Arvicanthis niloticus LC
      - Genus: Colomys
        - African wading rat, Colomys goslingi LC
      - Genus: Dasymys
        - African marsh rat, Dasymys incomtus LC
        - Montane shaggy rat, Dasymys montanus VU
      - Genus: Grammomys
        - Woodland thicket rat, Grammomys dolichurus LC
        - Forest thicket rat, Grammomys dryas NT
        - Macmillan's thicket rat, Grammomys macmillani LC
        - Shining thicket rat, Grammomys rutilans LC
      - Genus: Heimyscus
        - African smoky mouse, Heimyscus fumosus LC
      - Genus: Hybomys
        - Moon striped mouse, Hybomys lunaris VU
        - Peters's striped mouse, Hybomys univittatus LC
      - Genus: Hylomyscus
        - Beaded wood mouse, Hylomyscus aeta LC
        - Allen's wood mouse, Hylomyscus alleni LC
        - Montane wood mouse, Hylomyscus denniae LC
        - Little wood mouse, Hylomyscus parvus LC
        - Stella wood mouse, Hylomyscus stella LC
      - Genus: Lemniscomys
        - Griselda's striped grass mouse, Lemniscomys griselda LC
        - Buffoon striped grass mouse, Lemniscomys macculus LC
        - Typical striped grass mouse, Lemniscomys striatus LC
        - Heuglin's striped grass mouse, Lemniscomys zebra LC
      - Genus: Malacomys
        - Big-eared swamp rat, Malacomys longipes LC
      - Genus: Mastomys
        - Guinea multimammate mouse, Mastomys erythroleucus LC
        - Natal multimammate mouse, Mastomys natalensis LC
      - Genus: Mus
        - Toad mouse, Mus bufo LC
        - Callewaert's mouse, Mus callewaerti DD
        - African pygmy mouse, Mus minutoides LC
        - Neave's mouse, Mus neavei DD
        - Peters's mouse, Mus setulosus LC
        - Thomas's pygmy mouse, Mus sorella LC
        - Gray-bellied pygmy mouse, Mus triton LC
      - Genus: Mylomys
        - African groove-toothed rat, Mylomys dybowskii LC
      - Genus: Myomyscus
        - Angolan multimammate mouse, Myomyscus angolensis LC
      - Genus: Oenomys
        - Common rufous-nosed rat, Oenomys hypoxanthus LC
      - Genus: Pelomys
        - Bell groove-toothed swamp rat, Pelomys campanae LC
        - Creek groove-toothed swamp rat, Pelomys fallax LC
        - Least groove-toothed swamp rat, Pelomys minor LC
      - Genus: Praomys
        - Jackson's soft-furred mouse, Praomys jacksoni LC
        - Lukolela swamp rat, Praomys lukolelae LC
        - Least soft-furred mouse, Praomys minor DD
        - Misonne's soft-furred mouse, Praomys misonnei LC
        - Muton's soft-furred mouse, Praomys mutoni NT
        - Tullberg's soft-furred mouse, Praomys tullbergi LC
        - Verschuren's swamp rat, Praomys verschureni NT
      - Genus: Rhabdomys
        - Four-striped grass mouse, Rhabdomys pumilio LC
      - Genus: Stochomys
        - Target rat, Stochomys longicaudatus LC
      - Genus: Thallomys
        - Acacia rat, Thallomys paedulcus LC
      - Genus: Thamnomys
        - Kemp's thicket rat, Thamnomys kempi VU
        - Charming thicket rat, Thamnomys venustus NT
      - Genus: Zelotomys
        - Hildegarde's broad-headed mouse, Zelotomys hildegardeae LC

== Order: Lagomorpha (lagomorphs) ==
The lagomorphs comprise two families, Leporidae (hares and rabbits), and Ochotonidae (pikas). Though they can resemble rodents, and were classified as a superfamily in that order until the early 20th century, they have since been considered a separate order. They differ from rodents in a number of physical characteristics, such as having four incisors in the upper jaw rather than two.

- Family: Leporidae (rabbits, hares)
  - Genus: Poelagus
    - Bunyoro rabbit, Poelagus marjorita LR/lc
  - Genus: Lepus
    - African savanna hare, Lepus microtis LR/lc

== Order: Eulipotyphla (shrews, moles, hedgehogs and gymnures) ==
The order Eulipotyphla constitutes four families, of which only the Soricidae family is found in the Congo. The Soricidae family are made up of shrews, recognisable by their overall rat-like in appearance.

- Family: Soricidae (shrews)
  - Subfamily: Crocidurinae
    - Genus: Crocidura
      - Hun shrew, Crocidura attila LC
      - African dusky shrew, Crocidura caliginea LC
      - Greater Congo shrew, Crocidura polli LC
      - Long-footed shrew, Crocidura crenata LC
      - Reddish-gray musk shrew, Crocidura cyanea LC
      - Dent's shrew, Crocidura denti LC
      - Long-tailed musk shrew, Crocidura dolichura LC
      - Savanna shrew, Crocidura fulvastra LC
      - Bicolored musk shrew, Crocidura fuscomurina LC
      - Goliath shrew, Crocidura goliath LC
      - Hildegarde's shrew, Crocidura hildegardeae LC
      - Lesser red musk shrew, Crocidura hirta LC
      - Jackson's shrew, Crocidura jacksoni LC
      - Kivu shrew, Crocidura kivuana VU
      - Kivu long-haired shrew, Crocidura lanosa VU
      - Latona's shrew, Crocidura latona LC
      - Butiaba naked-tailed shrew, Crocidura littoralis LC
      - Ludia's shrew, Crocidura ludia LC
      - Moonshine shrew, Crocidura luna LC
      - Swamp musk shrew, Crocidura mariquensis LC
      - African black shrew, Crocidura nigrofusca LC
      - Niobe's shrew, Crocidura niobe LC
      - African giant shrew, Crocidura olivieri LC
      - Small-footed shrew, Crocidura parvipes LC
      - Flat-headed shrew, Crocidura planiceps DD
      - Polia's shrew, Crocidura polia DD
      - Roosevelt's shrew, Crocidura roosevelti LC
      - Kahuzi swamp shrew, Crocidura stenocephala VU
      - Tarella shrew, Crocidura tarella VU
      - Turbo shrew, Crocidura turba LC
      - Upemba shrew, Crocidura zimmeri DD
    - Genus: Paracrocidura
      - Grauer's large-headed shrew, Paracrocidura graueri DD
      - Greater large-headed shrew, Paracrocidura maxima NT
      - Lesser large-headed shrew, Paracrocidura schoutedeni LC
    - Genus: Ruwenzorisorex
      - Ruwenzori shrew, Ruwenzorisorex suncoides VU
    - Genus: Scutisorex
      - Armored shrew, Scutisorex somereni LC
    - Genus: Suncus
      - Least dwarf shrew, Suncus infinitesimus LC
      - Greater dwarf shrew, Suncus lixus LC
      - Lesser dwarf shrew, Suncus varilla LC
    - Genus: Sylvisorex
      - Grant's forest shrew, Sylvisorex granti LC
      - Johnston's forest shrew, Sylvisorex johnstoni LC
      - Climbing shrew, Sylvisorex megalura LC
      - Lesser forest shrew, Sylvisorex oriundus DD
      - Volcano shrew, Sylvisorex vulcanorum LC
  - Subfamily: Myosoricinae
    - Genus: Congosorex
      - Greater Congo shrew, Congosorex polli DD
    - Genus: Myosorex
      - Babault's mouse shrew, Myosorex babaulti VU
      - Schaller's mouse shrew, Myosorex schalleri DD

== Order: Chiroptera (bats) ==
The bats' most distinguishing feature is that their forelimbs are developed as wings, making them the only mammals capable of flight. Bat species account for about 20% of all mammals.

- Family: Pteropodidae (flying foxes, Old World fruit bats)
  - Subfamily: Pteropodinae
    - Genus: Casinycteris
      - Short-palated fruit bat, Casinycteris argynnis NT
    - Genus: Eidolon
      - Straw-coloured fruit bat, Eidolon helvum LC
    - Genus: Epomophorus
      - Peters's epauletted fruit bat, Epomophorus crypturus LC
      - Gambian epauletted fruit bat, Epomophorus gambianus LC
      - Ethiopian epauletted fruit bat, Epomophorus labiatus LC
      - Wahlberg's epauletted fruit bat, Epomophorus wahlbergi LC
    - Genus: Epomops
      - Dobson's epauletted fruit bat, Epomops dobsoni LC
      - Franquet's epauletted fruit bat, Epomops franqueti LC
    - Genus: Hypsignathus
      - Hammer-headed bat, Hypsignathus monstrosus LC
    - Genus: Lissonycteris
      - Angolan rousette, Lissonycteris angolensis LC
    - Genus: Micropteropus
      - Hayman's dwarf epauletted fruit bat, Micropteropus intermedius DD
      - Peters's dwarf epauletted fruit bat, Micropteropus pusillus LC
    - Genus: Myonycteris
      - Little collared fruit bat, Myonycteris torquata LC
    - Genus: Plerotes
      - D'Anchieta's fruit bat, Plerotes anchietae DD
    - Genus: Rousettus
      - Egyptian fruit bat, Rousettus aegyptiacus LC
      - Long-haired rousette, Rousettus lanosus LC
    - Genus: Scotonycteris
      - Zenker's fruit bat, Scotonycteris zenkeri NT
  - Subfamily: Macroglossinae
    - Genus: Megaloglossus
      - Woermann's bat, Megaloglossus woermanni LC
- Family: Vespertilionidae
  - Subfamily: Kerivoulinae
    - Genus: Kerivoula
      - Damara woolly bat, Kerivoula argentata LC
      - Copper woolly bat, Kerivoula cuprosa NT
      - Lesser woolly bat, Kerivoula lanosa LC
      - Spurrell's woolly bat, Kerivoula phalaena NT
      - Smith's woolly bat, Kerivoula smithi LC
  - Subfamily: Myotinae
    - Genus: Myotis
      - Rufous mouse-eared bat, Myotis bocagii LC
      - Cape hairy bat, Myotis tricolor LC
      - Welwitsch's bat, Myotis welwitschii LC
  - Subfamily: Vespertilioninae
    - Genus: Glauconycteris
      - Allen's striped bat, Glauconycteris alboguttata DD
      - Silvered bat, Glauconycteris argentata LC
      - Beatrix's bat, Glauconycteris beatrix NT
      - Curry's bat, Glauconycteris curryae DD
      - Allen's spotted bat, Glauconycteris humeralis DD
      - Abo bat, Glauconycteris poensis LC
      - Pied bat, Glauconycteris superba VU
      - Butterfly bat, Glauconycteris variegata LC
    - Genus: Hypsugo
      - Anchieta's pipistrelle, Hypsugo anchietae LC
      - Broad-headed pipistrelle, Hypsugo crassulus LC
      - Eisentraut's pipistrelle, Hypsugo eisentrauti DD
      - Mouselike pipistrelle, Hypsugo musciculus DD
    - Genus: Laephotis
      - Angolan long-eared bat, Laephotis angolensis NT
      - Botswanan long-eared bat, Laephotis botswanae LC
    - Genus: Mimetillus
      - Moloney's mimic bat, Mimetillus moloneyi LC
    - Genus: Neoromicia
      - Dark-brown serotine, Neoromicia brunneus NT
      - Cape serotine, Neoromicia capensis LC
      - Tiny serotine, Neoromicia guineensis LC
      - Melck's house bat, Neoromicia melckorum DD
      - Banana pipistrelle, Neoromicia nanus LC
      - Rendall's serotine, Neoromicia rendalli LC
      - Somali serotine, Neoromicia somalicus LC
      - White-winged serotine, Neoromicia tenuipinnis LC
      - Zulu serotine, Neoromicia zuluensis LC
    - Genus: Nycticeinops
      - Schlieffen's bat, Nycticeinops schlieffeni LC
    - Genus: Pipistrellus
      - Tiny pipistrelle, Pipistrellus nanulus LC
      - Rüppell's pipistrelle, Pipistrellus rueppelli LC
    - Genus: Scotoecus
      - Light-winged lesser house bat, Scotoecus albofuscus DD
      - Dark-winged lesser house bat, Scotoecus hirundo DD
    - Genus: Scotophilus
      - African yellow bat, Scotophilus dinganii LC
      - Schreber's yellow bat, Scotophilus nigrita NT
      - Nut-colored yellow bat, Scotophilus nux LC
  - Subfamily: Miniopterinae
    - Genus: Miniopterus
      - Lesser long-fingered bat, Miniopterus fraterculus LC
      - Greater long-fingered bat, Miniopterus inflatus LC
      - Least long-fingered bat, Miniopterus minor NT
      - Natal long-fingered bat, Miniopterus natalensis NT
- Family: Molossidae
  - Genus: Chaerephon
    - Duke of Abruzzi's free-tailed bat, Chaerephon aloysiisabaudiae NT
    - Ansorge's free-tailed bat, Chaerephon ansorgei LC
    - Gland-tailed free-tailed bat, Chaerephon bemmeleni LC
    - Chapin's free-tailed bat, Chaerephon chapini DD
    - Gallagher's free-tailed bat, Chaerephon gallagheri CR
    - Lappet-eared free-tailed bat, Chaerephon major LC
    - Nigerian free-tailed bat, Chaerephon nigeriae LC
    - Little free-tailed bat, Chaerephon pumila LC
    - Russet free-tailed bat, Chaerephon russata NT
    - Chapin's free-tailed bat, Chaerephon shortridgei NT
  - Genus: Mops
    - Sierra Leone free-tailed bat, Mops brachypterus LC
    - Angolan free-tailed bat, Mops condylurus LC
    - Medje free-tailed bat, Mops congicus NT
    - Mongalla free-tailed bat, Mops demonstrator NT
    - Midas free-tailed bat, Mops midas LC
    - Dwarf free-tailed bat, Mops nanulus LC
    - Niangara free-tailed bat, Mops niangarae DD
    - White-bellied free-tailed bat, Mops niveiventer LC
    - Railer bat, Mops thersites LC
    - Trevor's free-tailed bat, Mops trevori VU
  - Genus: Myopterus
    - Daubenton's free-tailed bat, Myopterus daubentonii NT
    - Bini free-tailed bat, Myopterus whitleyi LC
  - Genus: Otomops
    - Large-eared free-tailed bat, Otomops martiensseni NT
  - Genus: Tadarida
    - Egyptian free-tailed bat, Tadarida aegyptiaca LC
    - Madagascan large free-tailed bat, Tadarida fulminans LC
    - African giant free-tailed bat, Tadarida ventralis NT
- Family: Emballonuridae
  - Genus: Coleura
    - African sheath-tailed bat, Coleura afra LC
  - Genus: Saccolaimus
    - Pel's pouched bat, Saccolaimus peli NT
  - Genus: Taphozous
    - Mauritian tomb bat, Taphozous mauritianus LC
    - Naked-rumped tomb bat, Taphozous nudiventris LC
    - Egyptian tomb bat, Taphozous perforatus LC
- Family: Nycteridae
  - Genus: Nycteris
    - Bate's slit-faced bat, Nycteris arge LC
    - Large slit-faced bat, Nycteris grandis LC
    - Hairy slit-faced bat, Nycteris hispida LC
    - Intermediate slit-faced bat, Nycteris intermedia NT
    - Large-eared slit-faced bat, Nycteris macrotis LC
    - Ja slit-faced bat, Nycteris major VU
    - Dwarf slit-faced bat, Nycteris nana LC
    - Egyptian slit-faced bat, Nycteris thebaica LC
- Family: Megadermatidae
  - Genus: Lavia
    - Yellow-winged bat, Lavia frons LC
- Family: Rhinolophidae
  - Subfamily: Rhinolophinae
    - Genus: Rhinolophus
      - Halcyon horseshoe bat, Rhinolophus alcyone LC
      - Blasius's horseshoe bat, R. blasii LC
      - Geoffroy's horseshoe bat, Rhinolophus clivosus LC
      - Darling's horseshoe bat, Rhinolophus darlingi LC
      - Rüppell's horseshoe bat, Rhinolophus fumigatus LC
      - Hildebrandt's horseshoe bat, Rhinolophus hildebrandti LC
      - Lander's horseshoe bat, Rhinolophus landeri LC
      - Ruwenzori horseshoe bat, Rhinolophus ruwenzorii VU
  - Subfamily: Hipposiderinae
    - Genus: Cloeotis
      - Percival's trident bat, Cloeotis percivali VU
    - Genus: Hipposideros
      - Aba roundleaf bat, Hipposideros abae NT
      - Benito roundleaf bat, Hipposideros beatus LC
      - Sundevall's roundleaf bat, Hipposideros caffer LC
      - Greater roundleaf bat, Hipposideros camerunensis DD
      - Cyclops roundleaf bat, Hipposideros cyclops LC
      - Sooty roundleaf bat, Hipposideros fuliginosus NT
      - Giant roundleaf bat, Hipposideros gigas LC
      - Commerson's roundleaf bat, Hipposideros marungensis NT
      - Noack's roundleaf bat, Hipposideros ruber LC
    - Genus: Triaenops
      - Persian trident bat, Triaenops persicus LC

== Order: Pholidota (pangolins) ==
The order Pholidota comprises the eight species of pangolin. Pangolins are anteaters and have the powerful claws, elongated snout and long tongue seen in the other unrelated anteater species.

- Family: Manidae
  - Genus: Manis
    - Giant pangolin, Manis gigantea LR/lc
    - Ground pangolin, Manis temminckii LR/nt
    - Long-tailed pangolin, Manis tetradactyla LR/lc
    - Tree pangolin, Manis tricuspis LR/lc

== Order: Cetacea (whales) ==
The order Cetacea includes whales, dolphins and porpoises. They are the mammals most fully adapted to aquatic life with a spindle-shaped nearly hairless body, protected by a thick layer of blubber, and forelimbs and tail modified to provide propulsion underwater.

- Suborder: Mysticeti
  - Family: Balaenopteridae
    - Subfamily: Megapterinae
      - Genus: Megaptera
        - Humpback whale, Megaptera novaeangliae LC (possibly not as abundant as other populations)
    - Subfamily: Balaenopterinae
      - Genus: Balaenoptera
        - Southern blue whale, Balaenoptera m. musculus intermedia EN (formerly in large numbers)
        - Southern fin whale, Balaenoptera physalus quoyi EN
        - Southern sei whale, Balaenoptera borealis schlegelii EN
        - Bryde's whale, Balaenoptera edeni DD
        - Antarctic minke whale, Balaenoptera bonaerensis DD
        - Common minke whale, Balaenoptera acutorostrata LR/nt
- Suborder: Odontoceti
  - Family: Physeteridae
    - Genus: Physeter
      - Sperm whale, Physeter macrocephalus VU
  - Superfamily: Platanistoidea
    - Family: Kogiidae
      - Genus: Kogia
        - Pygmy sperm whale, Kogia breviceps DD
        - Dwarf sperm whale, Kogia sima DD
    - Family: Delphinidae (marine dolphins)
      - Genus: Stenella
        - Pantropical spotted dolphin, Stenella attenuata DD
        - Clymene dolphin, Stenella clymene DD
        - Striped dolphin, Stenella coeruleoalba DD
        - Atlantic spotted dolphin, Stenella frontalis DD
        - Spinner dolphin, Stenella longirostris DD
      - Genus: Steno
        - Rough-toothed dolphin, Steno bredanensis DD
      - Genus: Sousa
        - Atlantic humpback dolphin, Sousa teuszii NT (now rare)
      - Genus: Tursiops
        - Common bottlenose dolphin, Tursiops truncatus DD
      - Genus: Lagenodelphis
        - Fraser's dolphin, Lagenodelphis hosei DD
      - Genus: Feresa
        - Pygmy killer whale, Feresa attenuata DD
      - Genus: Pseudorca
        - False killer whale, Pseudorca crassidens DD
      - Genus: Globicephala
        - Short-finned pilot whale, Globicephala macrorhynchus DD
      - Genus: Orcinus
        - Orca, Orcinus orca DD
      - Genus: Peponocephala
        - Melon-headed whale, Peponocephala electra DD
    - Family: Ziphidae
      - Genus: Mesoplodon
        - Blainville's beaked whale, Mesoplodon densirostris DD
      - Genus: Ziphius
        - Cuvier's beaked whale, Ziphius cavirostris DD

== Order: Carnivora (carnivorans) ==
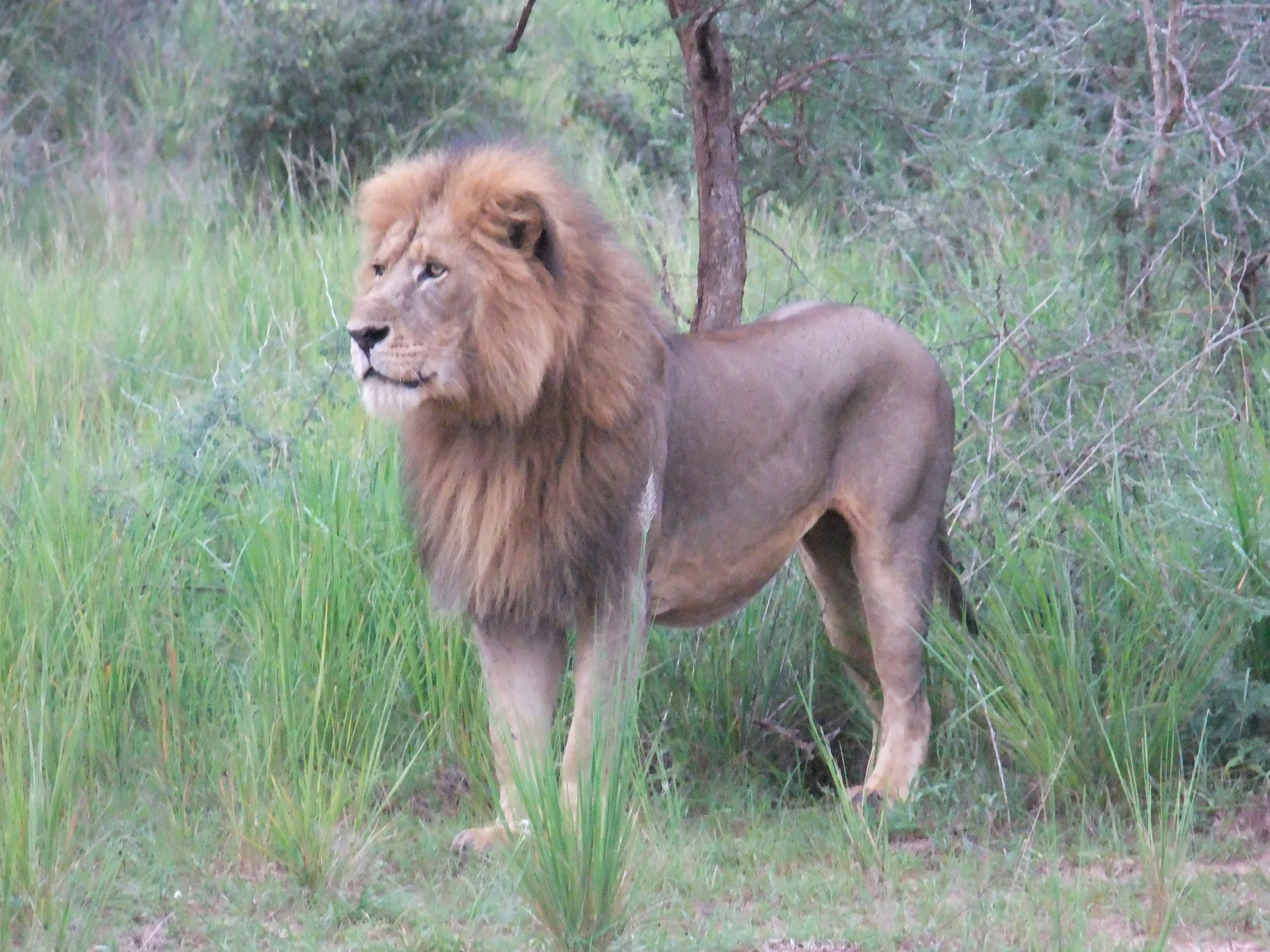
Lion

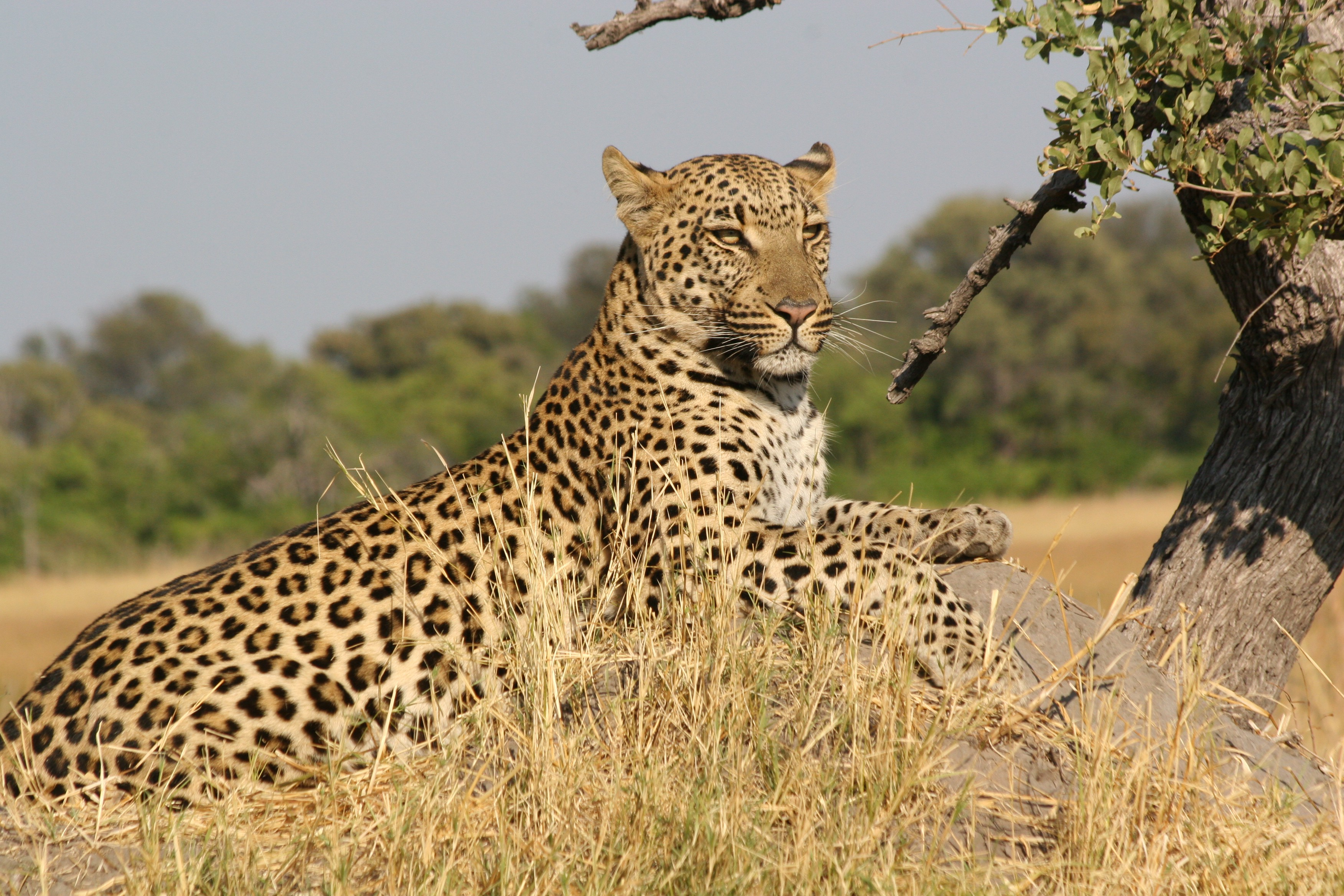
African leopard

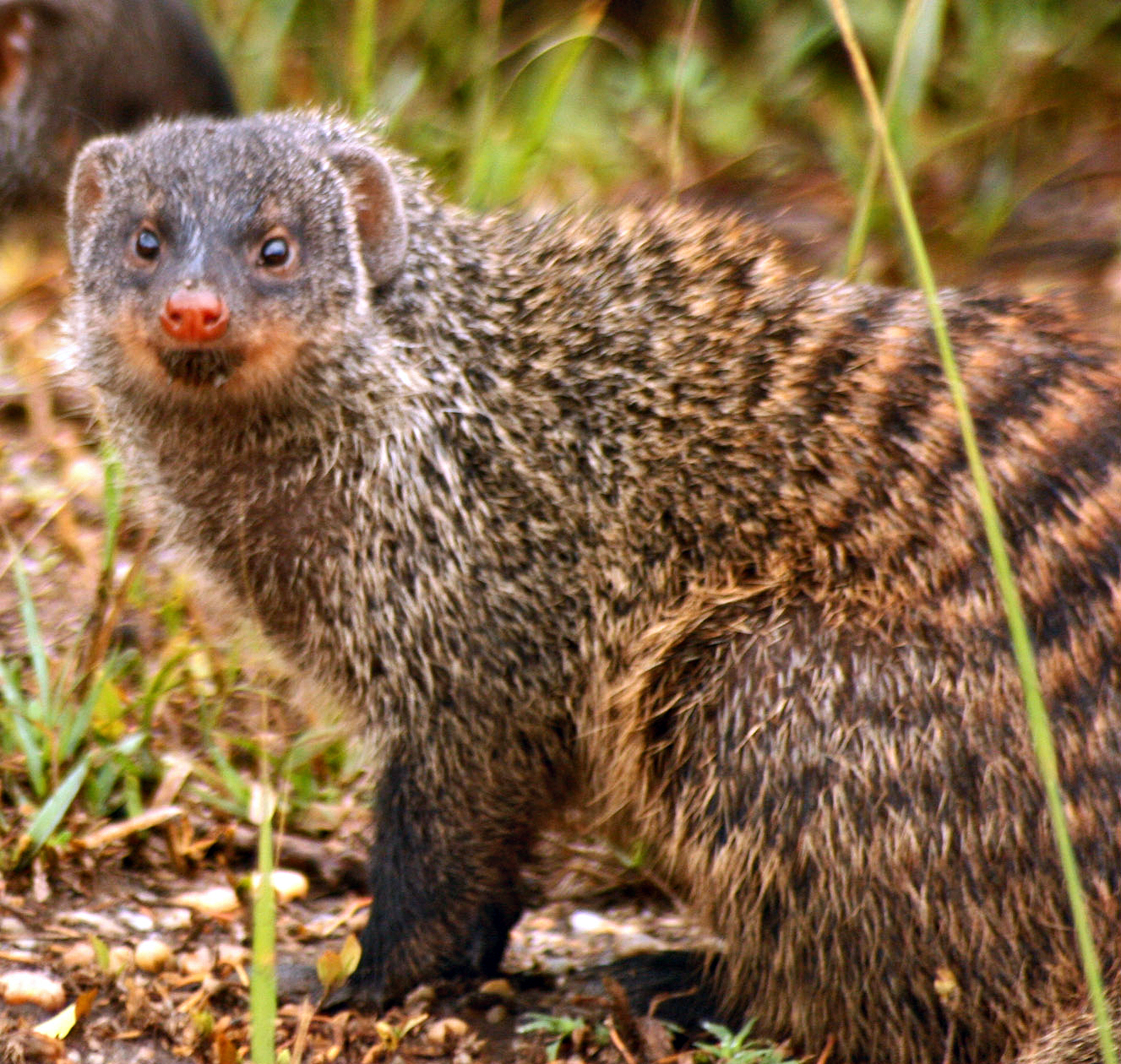
Banded mongoose

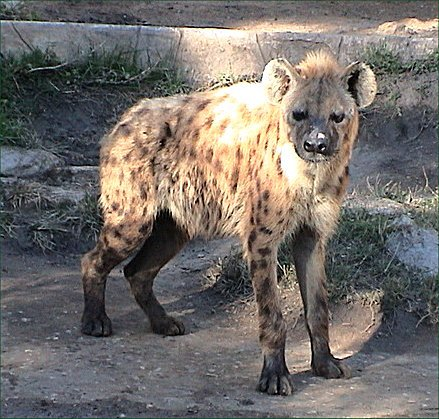
Spotted hyena

There are over 260 species of carnivorans, the majority of which feed primarily on meat. They have a characteristic skull shape and dentition.

- Suborder: Feliformia
  - Family: Felidae (cats)
    - Subfamily: Felinae
      - Genus: Acinonyx
        - Cheetah, Acinonyx jubatus VU
      - Genus: Caracal
        - Caracal, C. caracal LC
        - African golden cat, C. aurata VU
      - Genus: Leptailurus
        - Serval, L. serval LC
    - Subfamily: Pantherinae
      - Genus: Panthera
        - Lion, P. leo VU
        - Leopard, P. pardus VU
  - Family: Viverridae
    - Subfamily: Viverrinae
      - Genus: Civettictis
        - African civet, C. civetta LC
      - Genus: Genetta
        - Angolan genet, G. angolensis LC
        - Rusty-spotted genet, G. maculata LC
        - Servaline genet, G. servalina LC
        - Giant forest genet, G. victoriae LC
      - Genus: Osbornictis
        - Aquatic genet, O. piscivora NT
      - Genus: Poiana
        - Central African oyan, P. richardsonii LC
  - Family: Nandiniidae
    - Genus: Nandinia
      - African palm civet, N. binotata LC
  - Family: Herpestidae (mongooses)
    - Genus: Atilax
      - Marsh mongoose, A. paludinosus LC
    - Genus: Bdeogale
      - Bushy-tailed mongoose, B. crassicauda LC
      - Black-footed mongoose, B. nigripes LC
    - Genus: Crossarchus
      - Alexander's kusimanse, C. alexandri LC
      - Angolan kusimanse, C. ansorgei LC
    - Genus: Dologale
      - Pousargues's mongoose, D. dybowskii LC
    - Genus: Helogale
      - Common dwarf mongoose, Helogale parvula LC
    - Genus: Herpestes
      - Egyptian mongoose, H. ichneumon LC
      - Common slender mongoose, H. sanguineus LC
    - Genus: Ichneumia
      - White-tailed mongoose, I. albicauda LC
    - Genus: Mungos
      - Banded mongoose, M. mungo LC
    - Genus: Rhynchogale
      - Meller's mongoose, R. melleri LC
    - Genus: Xenogale
      - Long-nosed mongoose, X. naso LC
  - Family: Hyaenidae (hyaenas)
    - Genus: Crocuta
      - Spotted hyena, Crocuta crocuta LC
- Suborder: Caniformia
  - Family: Canidae (dogs, foxes)
    - Genus: Lupulella
      - Side-striped jackal, L. adusta LC
    - Genus: Lycaon
      - African wild dog, L. pictus EN possibly extirpated
  - Family: Mustelidae (mustelids)
    - Genus: Ictonyx
      - Striped polecat, Ictonyx striatus LC
    - Genus: Poecilogale
      - African striped weasel, P. albinucha LC
    - Genus: Mellivora
      - Honey badger, M. capensis LC
    - Genus: Lutra
      - Speckle-throated otter, L. maculicollis LC
    - Genus: Aonyx
      - African clawless otter, A. capensis LC

== Order: Perissodactyla (odd-toed ungulates) ==
The odd-toed ungulates are browsing and grazing mammals. They are usually large to very large, and have relatively simple stomachs and a large middle toe.

- Family: Equidae (horses etc.)
  - Genus: Equus
    - Plains zebra, E. quagga NT
      - Grant's zebra, E. q. boehmi NT
- Family: Rhinocerotidae
  - Genus: Ceratotherium
    - White rhinoceros, C. simum NT
      - Southern white rhinoceros, C. s. simum NT reintroduced
      - Northern white rhinoceros, C. s. cottoni CR extirpated

== Order: Artiodactyla (even-toed ungulates) ==
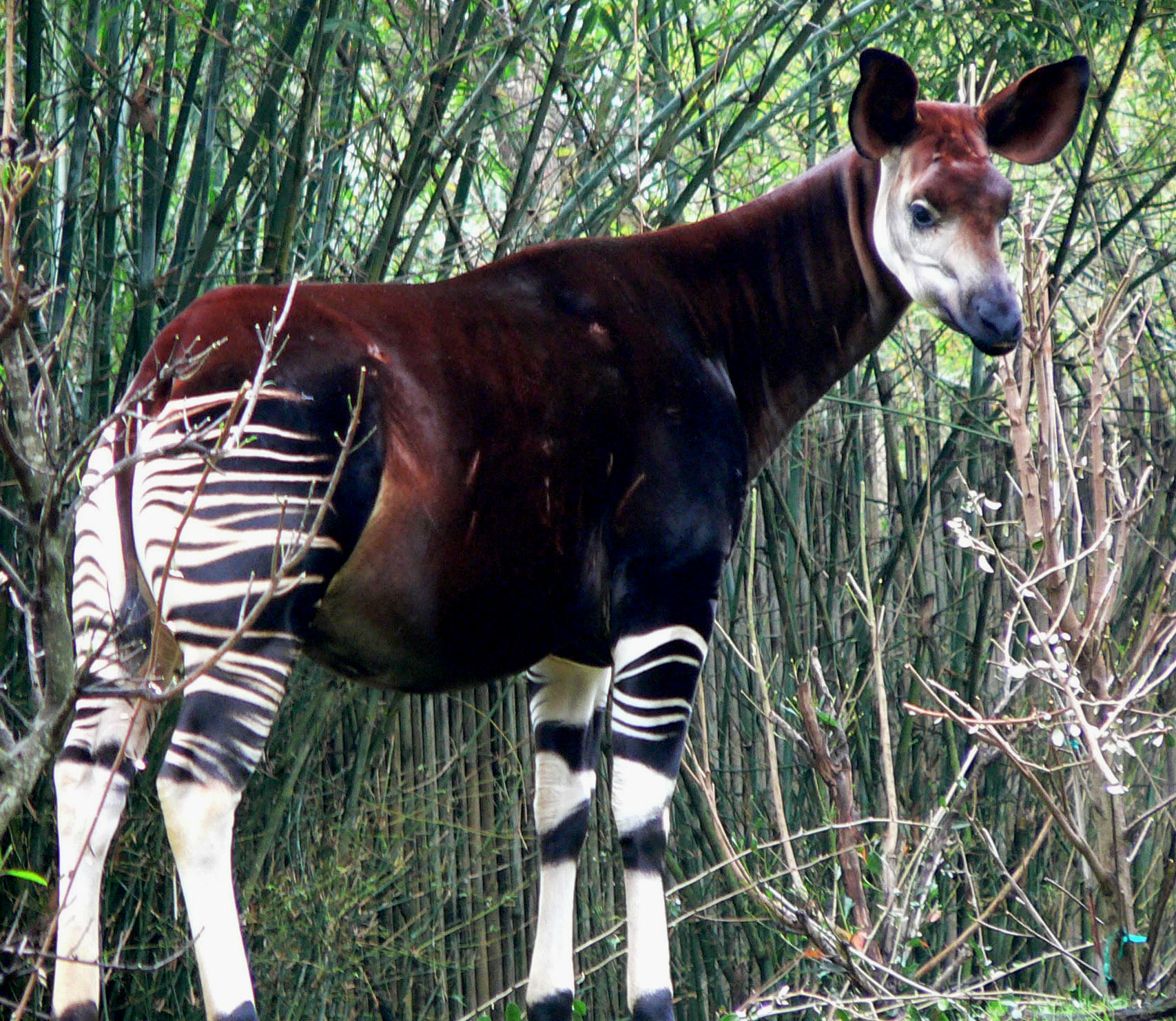
Okapi

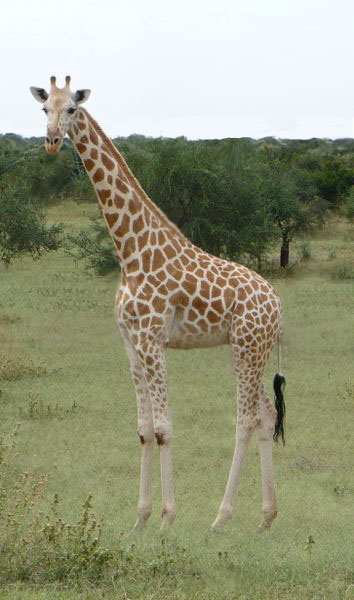
Northern giraffe

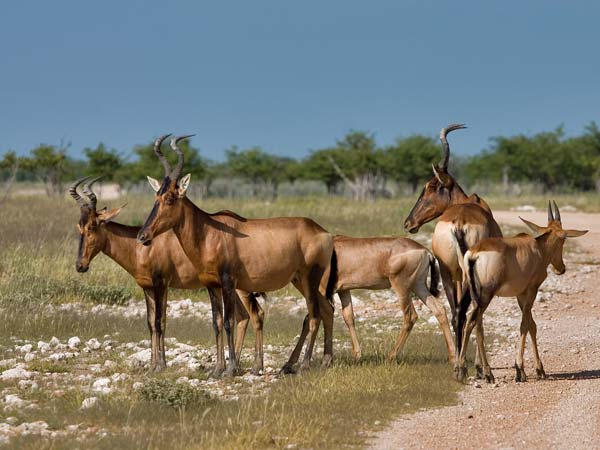
Hartebeest

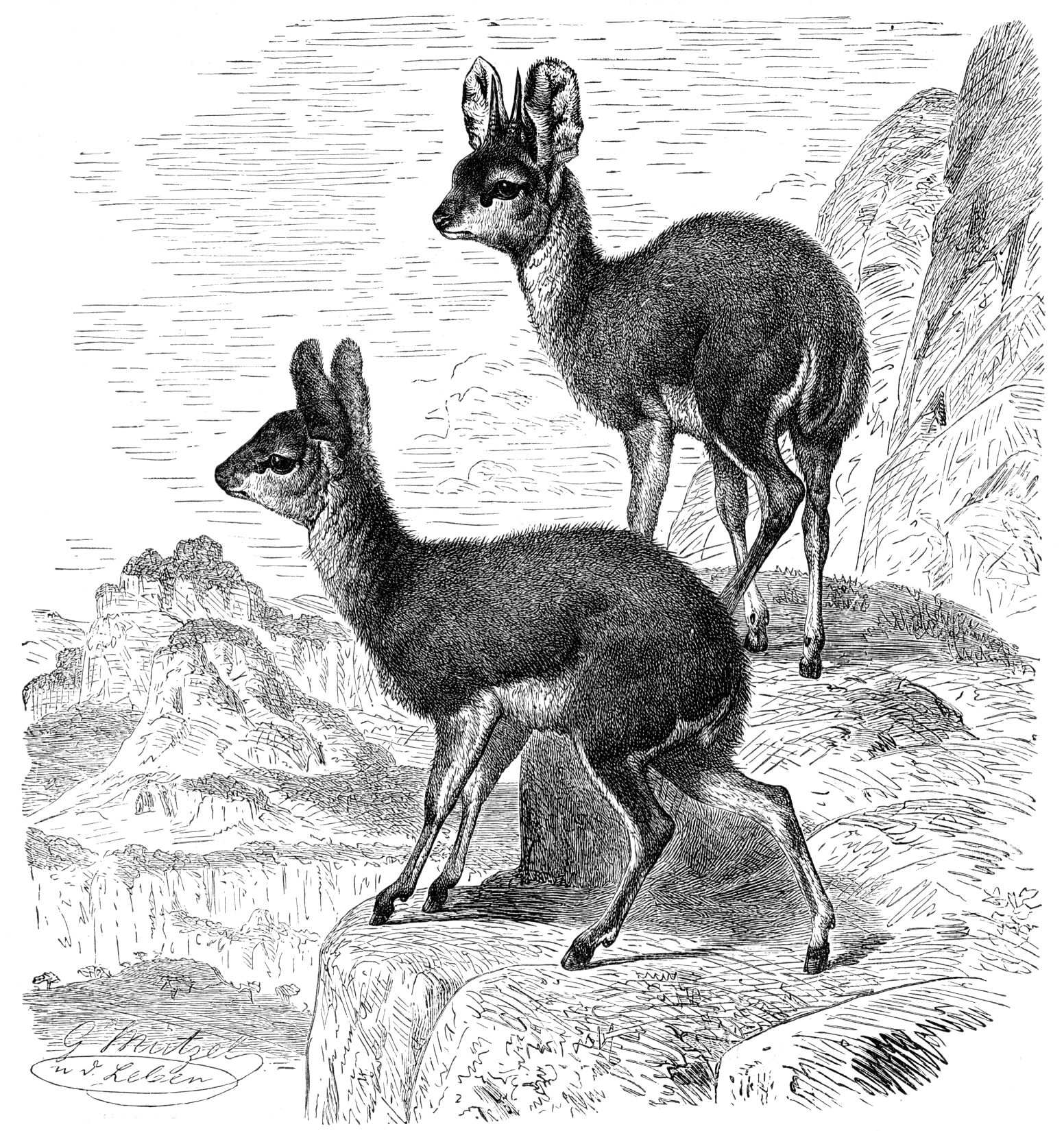
Klipspringer

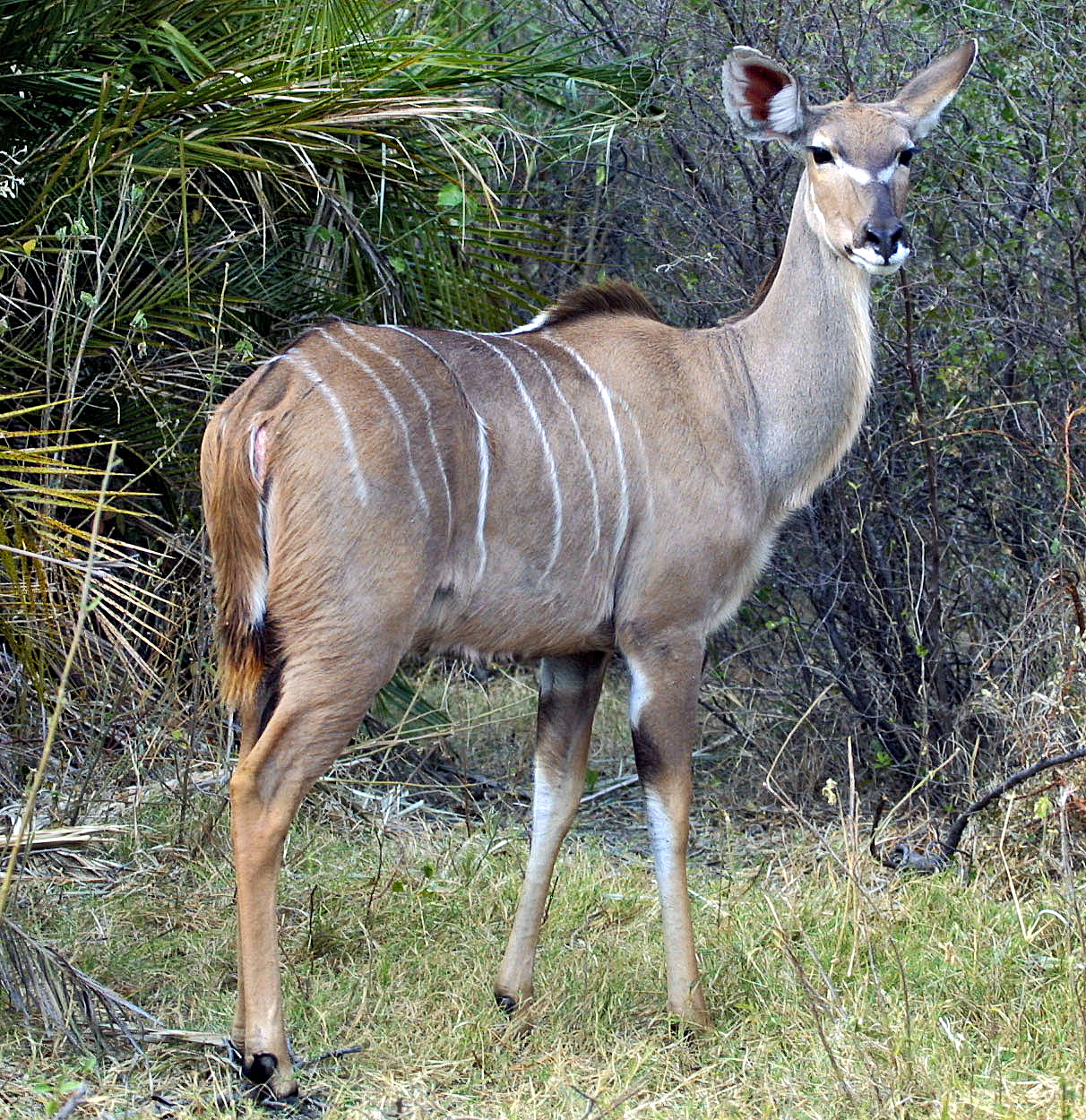
Greater kudu

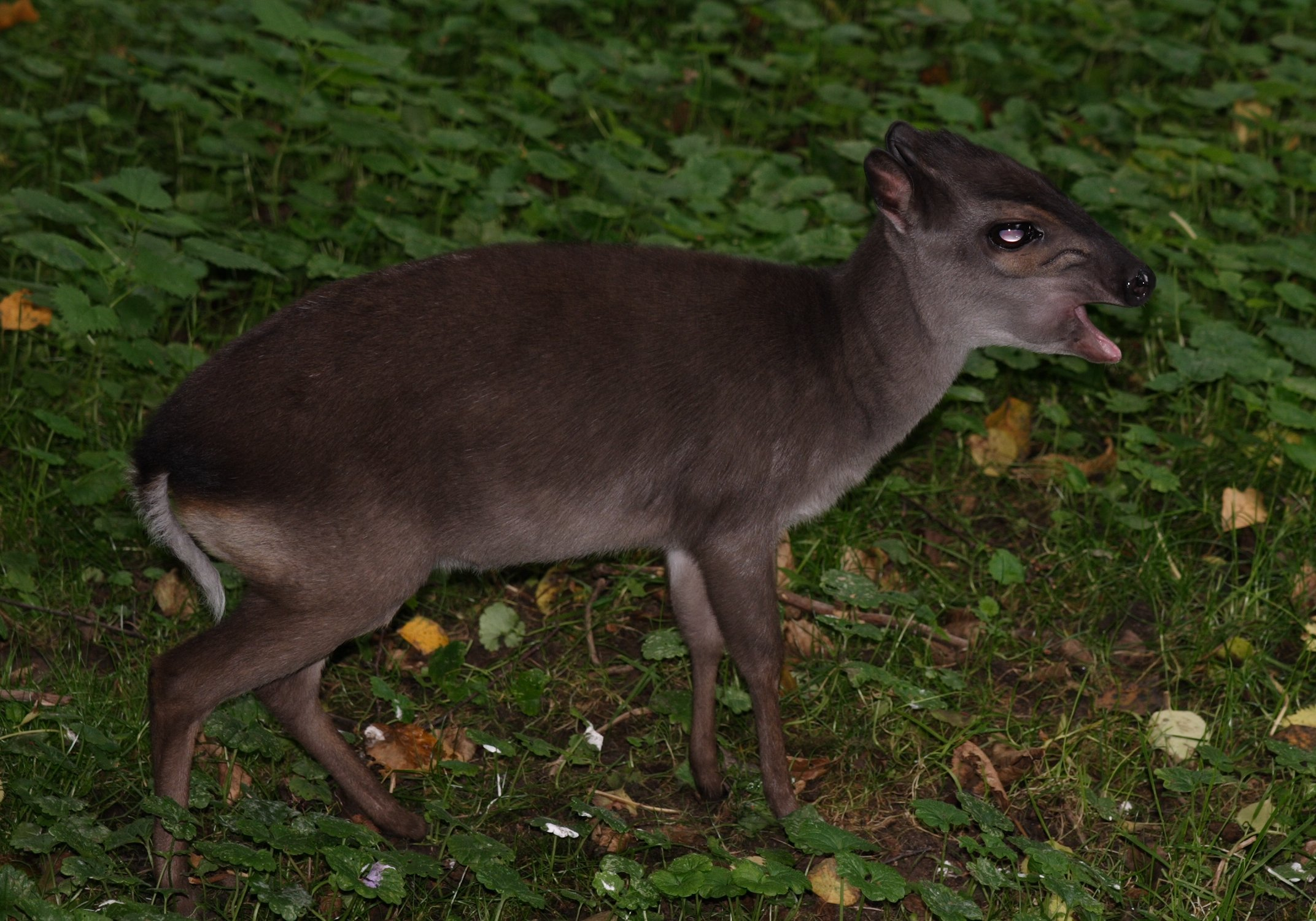
Blue duiker

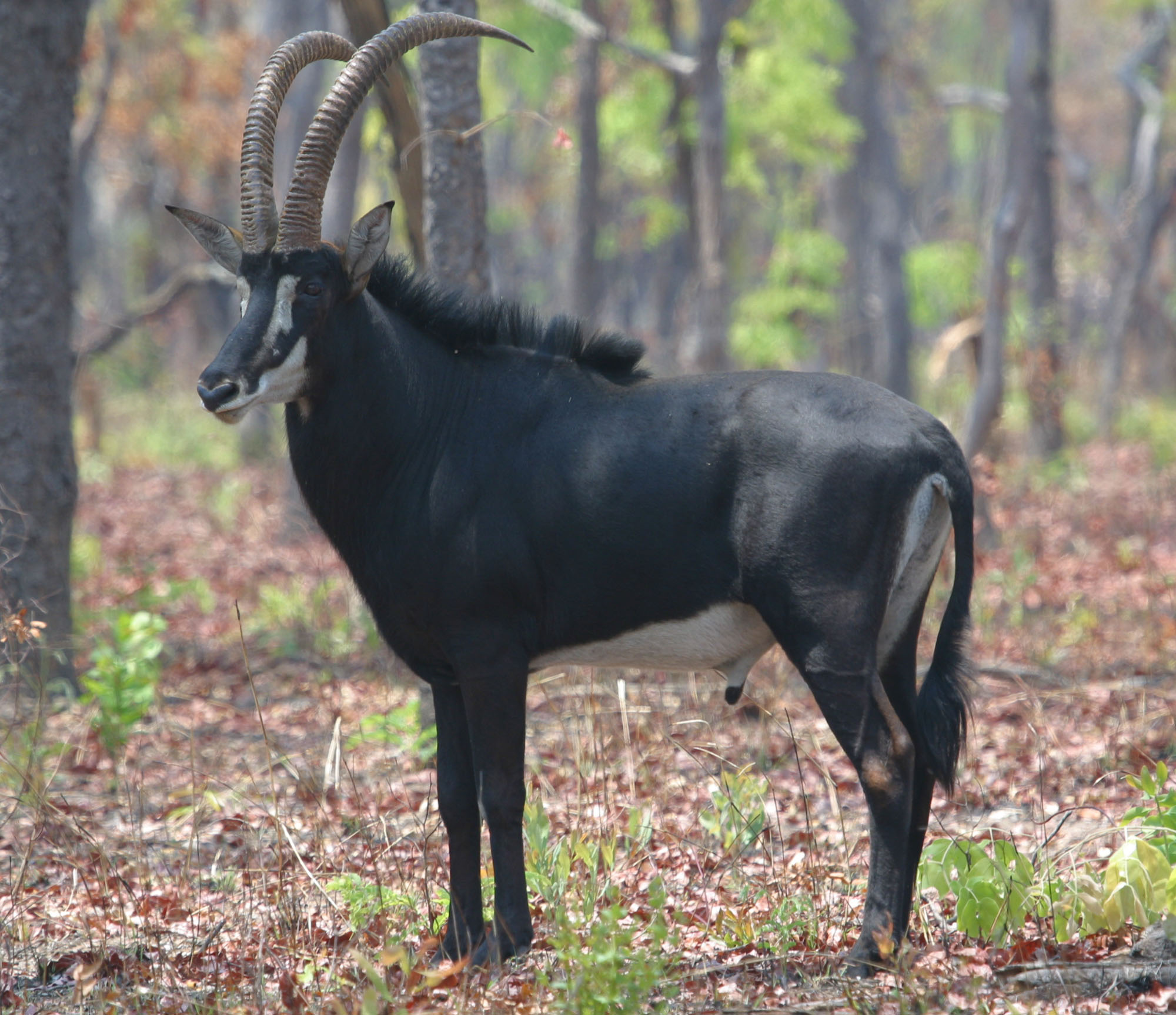
Sable antelope

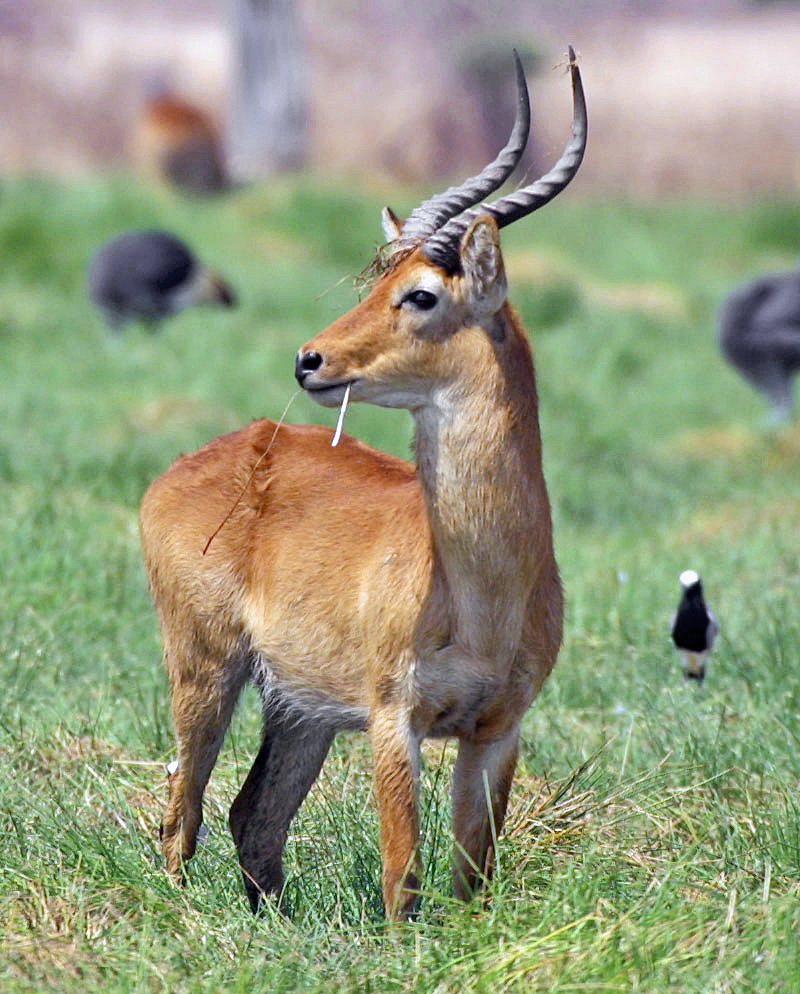
Puku

The even-toed ungulates are ungulates whose weight is borne about equally by the third and fourth toes, rather than mostly or entirely by the third as in perissodactyls. There are about 220 artiodactyl species, including many that are of great economic importance to humans.

- Family: Suidae (pigs)
  - Subfamily: Phacochoerinae
    - Genus: Phacochoerus
      - Common warthog, P. africanus
  - Subfamily: Suinae
    - Genus: Hylochoerus
      - Giant forest hog, H. meinertzhageni
    - Genus: Potamochoerus
      - Bushpig, P. larvatus
      - Red river hog, P. porcus
- Family: Hippopotamidae (hippopotamuses)
  - Genus: Hippopotamus
    - Hippopotamus, H. amphibius VU
- Family: Tragulidae
  - Genus: Hyemoschus
    - Water chevrotain, H. aquaticus DD
- Family: Giraffidae (giraffe, okapi)
  - Genus: Giraffa
    - Kordofan giraffe, G. camelopardalis antiquorum CR
    - Nubian giraffe, G. camelopardalis camelopardalis EN
    - Masai giraffe, G. tippelskirchi VU
  - Genus: Okapia
    - Okapi, O. johnstoni EN
- Family: Bovidae (cattle, antelope, sheep, goats)
  - Subfamily: Alcelaphinae
    - Genus: Alcelaphus
      - Hartebeest, A. buselaphus LR/cd
      - Lichtenstein's hartebeest, A. lichtensteinii LR/cd
    - Genus: Damaliscus
      - Topi, Damaliscus lunatus LR/cd
  - Subfamily: Antilopinae
    - Genus: Neotragus
      - Bates's pygmy antelope, N. batesi LR/nt
    - Genus: Oreotragus
      - Klipspringer, O. oreotragus LR/cd
    - Genus: Ourebia
      - Oribi, O. ourebi LR/cd
    - Genus: Raphicerus
      - Sharpe's grysbok, R. sharpei LR/cd
  - Subfamily: Bovinae
    - Genus: Syncerus
      - African buffalo, S. caffer LR/cd
    - Genus: Tragelaphus
      - Giant eland, T. derbianus LR/nt
      - Bongo, T. eurycerus LR/nt
      - Common eland, T. oryx LR/cd
      - Bushbuck, T. scriptus LR/lc
      - Sitatunga, T. spekii LR/nt
      - Greater kudu, . strepsiceros LR/cd
  - Subfamily: Cephalophinae
    - Genus: Cephalophus
      - Peters's duiker, C. callipygus LR/nt
      - Bay duiker, C. dorsalis LR/nt
      - White-bellied duiker, C. leucogaster LR/nt
      - Blue duiker, C. monticola LR/lc
      - Black-fronted duiker, C. nigrifrons LR/nt
      - Red-flanked duiker, C. rufilatus LR/cd
      - Yellow-backed duiker, C. silvicultor LR/nt
      - Weyns's duiker, C. weynsi LR/nt
    - Genus: Sylvicapra
      - Common duiker, S. grimmia LR/lc
  - Subfamily: Hippotraginae
    - Genus: Hippotragus
      - Roan antelope, H. equinus LR/cd
      - Sable antelope, H. niger LR/cd
  - Subfamily: Aepycerotinae
    - Genus: Aepyceros
      - Impala, A. melampus LR/cd
  - Subfamily: Reduncinae
    - Genus: Kobus
      - Waterbuck, K. ellipsiprymnus LR/cd
      - Kob, K. kob LR/cd
      - Lechwe, K. leche LR/cd
      - Puku, K. vardonii LR/cd
    - Genus: Redunca
      - Southern reedbuck, R. arundinum LR/cd
      - Bohor reedbuck, R. redunca LR/cd

== See also ==
- List of chordate orders
- Lists of mammals by region
- List of prehistoric mammals
- Mammal classification
- List of mammals described in the 2000s
- List of amphibians of the Democratic Republic of the Congo
- List of birds of the Democratic Republic of the Congo
