= Large-headed shrew =

Large-headed shrew may refer to:

- Crocidura grandiceps, a species of white-toothed shrew also known as the large-headed forest shrew
- Paracrocidura, a genus of three white-toiothed shrew species
