= Sokoke dog mongoose =

Conservation status
- Vulnerable (IUCN 3.1)

Scientific classification
- Kingdom: Animalia
- Phylum: Chordata
- Class: Mammalia
- Order: Carnivora
- Family: Herpestidae
- Genus: Bdeogale
- Species: B. omnivora

Binomial name
- Bdeogale omnivora Heller, 1913

Species of mongoose from Central Africa

Sokoke dog mongoose (Bdeogale omnivora) is a mongoose species endemic to the East African coastal forests of Tanzania and Kenya.

== Distribution ==
The species was first observed from Amani Nature Reserve in Tanzania in 1939. Since then the species was not recorded from the country. However, in July 2003 during a bird watching excursion, the mongoose was observed by some ornithologists.

During camera trap surveys in 2019, the species was identified from two Kenyan coastal forests: Boni-Dodori Forest Complex (ca. 4000 km^{2}); and Arabuko Sokoke National Park (416 km^{2}).

== Characteristics ==
It is closely related to Bdeogale crassicauda, but primarily differ in coat color and smaller size. Body covered with yellow to orange underfur and grizzled dark brown guard hairs with lighter annulations. Limbs are dark chocolate brown to black in color. Head small with rounded ears. Tail bushy and short.

== Habitat and behavior ==
Many individuals were captured from Brachystegia woodland habitat. They are strictly nocturnal animals.
