= Gallagher's free-tailed bat =

Conservation status
- Data Deficient (IUCN 3.1)

Scientific classification
- Domain: Eukaryota
- Kingdom: Animalia
- Phylum: Chordata
- Class: Mammalia
- Order: Chiroptera
- Family: Molossidae
- Genus: Mops
- Species: M. gallagheri

Binomial name
- Mops gallagheri (Harrison, 1975)

Synonyms
- Tadarida gallagheri Harrison, 1975

Species of bat

Gallagher's free-tailed bat (Mops gallagheri) is a free-tailed bat endemic to the Democratic Republic of the Congo. Only one individual has ever been documented.

== Taxonomy and etymology ==
It was described as a new species in 1975 by David Harrison. The eponym for the species name "gallagheri" was Major Michael D. Gallagher, who collected the holotype.

Its distinct morphology has called into question whether it represents its own genus of bat.

== Description ==
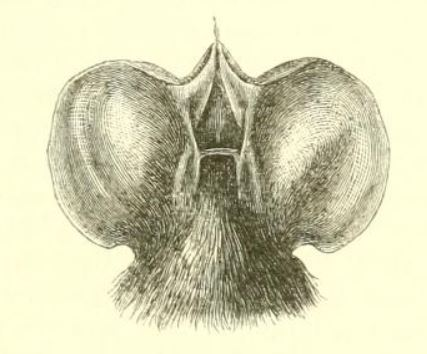
The interaural membrane in the northern free-tailed bat (dorsal view)

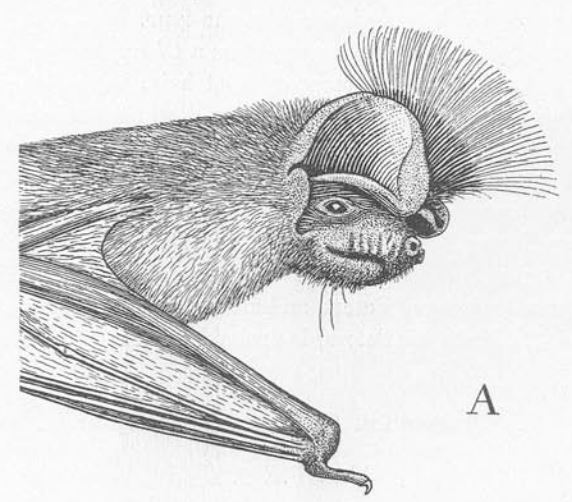
Male Chapin's free-tailed bat displaying its interaural crest

Its fur is umber in color, with the belly paler than its back. The fur is short, with individual hairs only 5–6 mm (0.20–0.24 in) long. Its flight membranes are grayish-black. It is a small free-tailed bat, with a forearm length of 37.5 mm (1.48 in). Its total length is 77 mm (3.0 in); its ear length is 19 mm (0.75 in); its tail is 28 mm (1.1 in) long; its hind foot is 8.4 mm (0.33 in) long. Its greatest length of skull is 16.0 mm (0.63 in). Its ears are large and conjoined via the interaural membrane. The interaural membrane has a deep, backwards-facing pocket containing an interaural crest with hairs approximately 9 mm (0.35 in) in length. The bat is likely able to evert this pocket to display the crest. It is unique in its family due to the presence of large, paired "nasal inflations" similar to those found in the mouse-tailed bats. Like other free-tailed bats, its tail extends beyond the margin of the uropatagium. It has a blunt snout. Its wings are long and narrow.

== Biology and ecology ==
As only one individual—a male—has been documented, little is known about its biology and ecology. Based on other members of its genus, it is hypothesized that Gallagher's free-tailed bat forages for insects at relatively high altitudes with a fast but not maneuverable flight.

== Range and habitat ==
The holotype was collected in the Scierie Forest, approximately 30 km (19 mi) southwest of Kindu, Democratic Republic of the Congo. It was captured in a mist net that was placed in the evergreen undergrowth of a partly-deciduous forest. The forest where the holotype was collected has been heavily logged. It is nocturnal, possibly roosting in hollow trees, rock crevices, or caves during the day.

== Conservation ==
It is currently evaluated as data deficient by the IUCN, meaning that not enough information is available to assess its conservation needs. From 1996–2008, it was considered critically endangered, the most dire assessment category. This species is known from only one individual ever documented—the holotype. Threats to this species are unclear, but possibly include habitat destruction.
