= Jackson's mongoose =

Conservation status
- Near Threatened (IUCN 3.1)

Scientific classification
- Kingdom: Animalia
- Phylum: Chordata
- Class: Mammalia
- Order: Carnivora
- Family: Herpestidae
- Genus: Bdeogale
- Species: B. jacksoni

Binomial name
- Bdeogale jacksoni (Thomas, 1894)
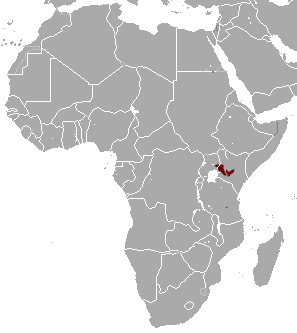
- Jackson's mongoose range

Species of mongoose from East Africa

Jackson's mongoose (Bdeogale jacksoni) is a mongoose species native to montane forests in Kenya, Uganda and Tanzania. It appears to be rare and has been classified as Near Threatened since 2008.

Its long and dense fur is grizzled black and white. The cheeks, throat and sides of the neck are yellowish. The legs are dark brown or black, and the bushy tail is white. With a head and body length of more than 50 cm (20 in) and a body weight of 2–3 kg (4.4–6.6 lb), it is a large mongoose. It is mainly nocturnal and crepuscular and possibly solitary. It feeds on rodents and insects.

== Taxonomy ==
Galeriscus jacksoni was the scientific name proposed by Oldfield Thomas in 1894 based on a skin of a badger-like animal collected by Frederick John Jackson in Kenya. He specified the type locality as Mianzini in Maasailand at an elevation of 2,400 m (8,000 ft). The generic name Galeriscus was recognised as a valid taxon by Paul Matschie, Glover Morrill Allen and Donovan Reginald Rosevear.

Jackson's mongoose was placed in the genus Bdeogale by Reginald Innes Pocock in 1916, who recognised that the animal was a mongoose and considered Galeriscus a synonym of Bdeogale. This classification has been widely followed.

== Characteristics ==
Jackson's mongoose is silvery grey with yellowish cheeks, throat and sides of the neck, a grizzled grey crown, but a brownish white muzzle and chin and a few brown hairs around the eyes. Its round ears are grizzled grey outside and yellowish inside. Its belly is light grey, its legs blackish brown or black, and the tip of the tail white. The dorsal hair is 20 mm (0.79 in) long with black and white rings, and it has dense and woolly underfur. The muzzle is blunt. The rhinarium is large, and the hairless extension of the median groove divides the upper lip. The fore and hind feet have only four digits without hallux and pollex. The soles are naked, and the claws are thick and strong. It is a large mongoose with a head and body length of 50.8–57.1 cm (20.0–22.5 in) and a 28.3–32.4 cm (11.1–12.8 in) long bushy tail. Its hind foot is 8.6–10.8 cm (3.4–4.3 in) long and its ear 2.3–3.5 cm (0.91–1.38 in) long. It weighs 2–3 kg (4.4–6.6 lb). The dental formula is 3.1.4.23.1.4.2 × 2 = 40, with three incisors, one canine, four premolars and two molars on either side of the jaw. Young but already breeding animals may be markedly smaller than adults. From the black-footed mongoose, it is distinguishable by its much longer fur, especially on the tail, and yellowish tints on neck and throat.

== Distribution and habitat ==
Jackson's mongoose is distributed in central and southern Kenya and southeastern Uganda, where it was recorded in the Aberdare Range, Mount Kenya and the Mount Elgon mountains at elevations from 300 to 3,300 m (980 to 10,830 ft). It inhabits lowland forests, bamboo and montane forests. In Tanzania's Udzungwa Mountains, it was first recorded in 2002 in the Matundu Forest.

== Behaviour and ecology ==
Jackson's mongoose is mainly nocturnal and crepuscular. In the Udzungwa Mountains, most of the 25 camera trap photos were taken by night. It is possibly solitary, but was also recorded in pairs and occasionally in groups of four. Nothing is known about its reproduction.

It probably hunts frequently in the thick herbaceous vegetation around swamps. It is an omnivore. Analysis of 40 feces samples collected in the Aberdare Mountains revealed that they contained remains of army ants, beetles, weevils, millipedes and caterpillars, rodents including Otomys, Dasymys and Praomys, as well as snails, lizards, and snake eggs. The diet of juveniles consisted foremost of rodents and insects. Feeding on army ants may be a recent evolutionary adaptation to this diet.

== Conservation ==
Jackson's mongoose occurs in isolated populations and appears to be rare. It has been listed as Near Threatened on the IUCN Red List since 2008, assuming a declining population size within the last 10 years due to habitat destruction. Given its dependence on forest habitat, its main threat is likely to be ongoing forest loss. It has been recorded in protected areas such Aberdare National Park, Mount Kenya National Park and Udzungwa Mountains National Park. It is suspected to also live in Mount Elgon National Park and probably more widely distributed than currently known. Full protection of forests adjacent to the Udzungwa Mountains National Park and a survey in other groundwater-dependent forests in the region has been recommended.
