= Greater large-headed shrew =

Conservation status
- Least Concern (IUCN 3.1)

Scientific classification
- Kingdom: Animalia
- Phylum: Chordata
- Class: Mammalia
- Order: Eulipotyphla
- Family: Soricidae
- Genus: Paracrocidura
- Species: P. maxima

Binomial name
- Paracrocidura maxima Heim de Balsac, 1959
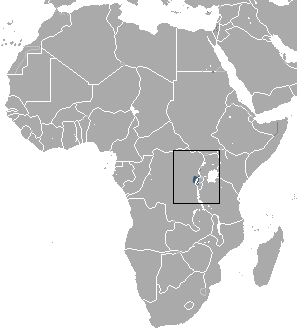
- Greater large-headed shrew range

Species of mammal

The greater large-headed shrew (Paracrocidura maxima) is a species of mammal in the family Soricidae. It is found in Burundi, Democratic Republic of the Congo, Rwanda, and Uganda. Its natural habitats are subtropical or tropical moist lowland and montane forests, and swamps.
