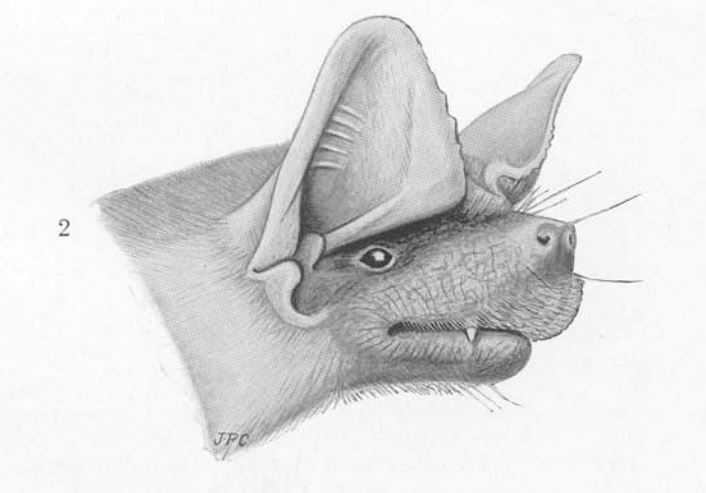

Conservation status
- Data Deficient (IUCN 3.1)

Scientific classification
- Kingdom: Animalia
- Phylum: Chordata
- Class: Mammalia
- Order: Chiroptera
- Family: Molossidae
- Genus: Myopterus
- Species: M. daubentonii

Binomial name
- Myopterus daubentonii Desmarest, 1820

Synonyms
- Myopterus albatus

= Daubenton's free-tailed bat =

Species of bat

The Daubenton's free-tailed bat or Daubenton's winged-mouse bat (Myopterus daubentonii) is a species of bat in the family Molossidae. It is found in Central African Republic, Democratic Republic of the Congo, Ivory Coast, and Senegal. Its natural habitats are subtropical or tropical dry forests and dry savanna.

== Taxonomy ==
The holotype for the species was captured in Senegal and observed by Daubenton in 1765, where it was named 'rat-volant'. Based on Daubenton's description, Oken renamed the species as Myopterus senegalensis. When it was realized that the name senegalensis was not available, the specimens of the bat from the Ivory Coast were referred to as M. albatus by Thomas in 1915. In 1993, Adam designated one neotype and four neoparatypes for M. daubentonii (Desmarest, 1820) a name that was also based on the 'rat-volant' of Daubenton, from a series collected in Senegal. M. albatus was designated as a subspecies of M. daubentonii. M. albatus is sometimes treated as a distinct species.

The bat is named after Louis-Jean-Marie Daubenton, who observed and named the holotype.

== Description ==
It is a small microbat without a nose leaf. The bat has a non-flattened head. The ears meet on its forehead to form a V-shaped valley. The ears are narrow and erect, whitish on the inner side and are without complex folds. It has a smooth upper lip and a subcylindrical, smooth and rounded muzzle, which is almost hairless except for a dense patch of spoon-hairs on its upper lip below its nostrils. The terminal portion of the tail projects freely from the posterior margin of the interfemoral membrane.

The dorsal pelage is dark cream, reddish-brown or greyish-brown in color, usually with two lateral bands of whitish or pale yellowish-fawn fur on each side of the mid-dorsal line. The hairs (except those of bands) are whitish or cream-colored with a darker tip. The crown and nape possess a large patch of color which is the same as the lateral bands. The bat's ventral pelage is uniformly dirty or creamy-white to pure white. It is much paler than and conspicuously contrasts with the dorsal pelage. There are no mid-ventral markings on the bat, and the ventral flank stripes are the same color as the flanks. The interfemoral membrane is dorsally pale brown and ventrally white. The skin of the forearm, tibia, fingers and tail is pink. Both sexes are usually similar in color.

The wings are white near the arm-wing and transparent near the hand-wings, with red veins and enclosed spots of fat visible. The wing membranes of the bats feel moist and somewhat sticky when alive. The bat has a forearm length of 48–54 mm (1.9–2.1 in). It weighs 18.45 g (0.651 oz).

Some of the specimens captured in Ivory Coast had a strong and pungent smell.

== Biology ==
The bat possesses robust and powerful mandibles, which indicates that it can consume large and hard-shelled prey. It is possible that the bat forages in groups.

== Distribution and habitat ==
The species is known from eight West and Central African localities. The bat has been reported from Côte d'Ivoire, Central African Republic, Senegal, and northern Democratic Republic of the Congo. It has a very wide range, but there are very few records are of this species. The bat has been recorded at the edge of dry forests and savanna, and appears to specialize in mosaic gallery forest. It is generally a lowland bat, but has also been recorded at elevations of up to 1250 m above sea level. Colonies of the bat are known to roost in hollow trees.

== Conservation ==
The bat is listed as data-deficient due to lack of knowledge about its habitat, distribution, and threats. This appears to be rare, due to the lack of specimens of it found. The bat is threatened mainly by habitat loss, especially the removal of trees that could have been potential roosts. Other threats to the species include agriculture and logging, both of which result in habitat degradation and ecosystem stress. There are no conservation measures aimed at protecting this species.
