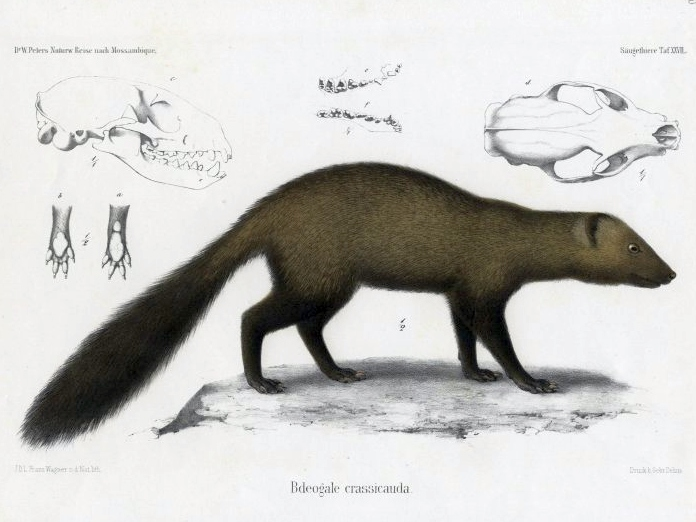
- Drawing, 1850

Scientific classification
- Kingdom: Animalia
- Phylum: Chordata
- Class: Mammalia
- Order: Carnivora
- Family: Herpestidae
- Subfamily: Herpestinae
- Genus: Bdeogale; Peters, 1850

Type species
- Bdeogale crassicauda Peters, 1850

Species
- see text
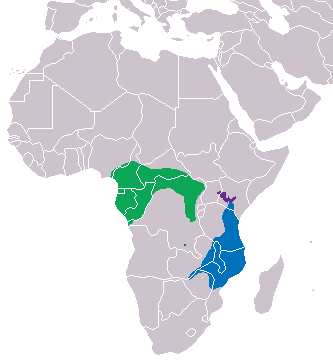
- Bdeogale crassicauda - blue Bdeogale jacksoni - violet Bdeogale nigripes - green

= Bdeogale =

Genus of carnivores

Bdeogale is a mongoose genus that was proposed by Wilhelm Peters in 1850 based on a mongoose specimen collected in Mozambique. Bdeogale species have compact paws with four symmetrical toes, round ears and a blunt muzzle with a broad round and bare rhinarium. The genus contains four species that are primarily terrestrial and omnivorous and forage in dense vegetation.

== Species ==
Name	Distribution and IUCN Red List status
Bushy-tailed mongoose (B. crassicauda) Peters, 1852	Kenya and Tanzania; LC
Black-footed mongoose (B. nigripes) Pucheran, 1855	LC
Jackson's mongoose (B. jacksoni) (Thomas, 1894)	NT
Sokoke dog mongoose (B. omnivora) Heller, 1914	Kenya and Tanzania; VU
