= Lesser large-headed shrew =

Conservation status
- Least Concern (IUCN 3.1)

Scientific classification
- Kingdom: Animalia
- Phylum: Chordata
- Class: Mammalia
- Order: Eulipotyphla
- Family: Soricidae
- Genus: Paracrocidura
- Species: P. schoutedeni

Binomial name
- Paracrocidura schoutedeni Heim de Balsac, 1956
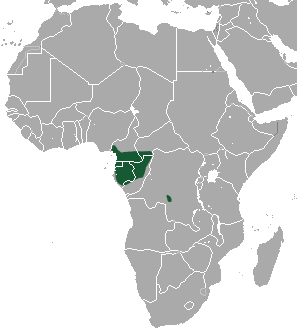
- Lesser large-headed shrew range

Species of mammal

The lesser large-headed shrew (Paracrocidura schoutedeni) is a species of shrew in the family Soricidae. It is found in Cameroon, Central African Republic, Republic of the Congo, Democratic Republic of the Congo, Equatorial Guinea, and Gabon. Its natural habitat is subtropical or tropical moist lowland forests.
