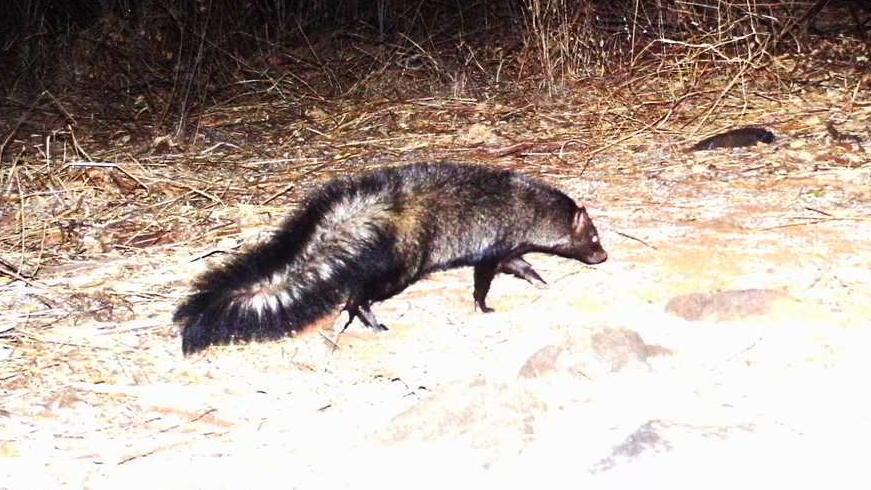

Conservation status
- Least Concern (IUCN 3.1)

Scientific classification
- Kingdom: Animalia
- Phylum: Chordata
- Class: Mammalia
- Order: Carnivora
- Family: Herpestidae
- Genus: Bdeogale
- Species: B. crassicauda

Binomial name
- Bdeogale crassicauda Peters, 1852
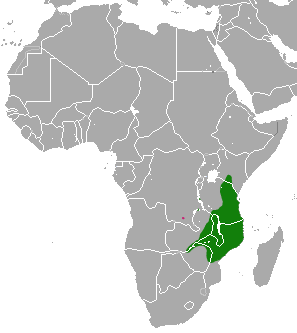
- Bushy-tailed mongoose range (green - extant, pink - probably extant)

= Bushy-tailed mongoose =

Species of mongoose from central Africa

The bushy-tailed mongoose (Bdeogale crassicauda) is a mammal in the family Herpestidae found in central Africa, from southern Kenya to central Mozambique.

== Characteristics ==
The bushy-tailed mongoose has a greyish to yellowish brown fur. The underfur is dense, and the guard hairs are 5–45 mm (0.20–1.77 in) long. Its head is rounded. It has short woolly ears and a plush muzzle. Its tail is wide and bushy. Five individuals captured in Arusha National Park had a head-to-body length of 383–407 mm (15.1–16.0 in) with a 230 mm (9.1 in) long tail and a 74.9–77.7 mm (2.95–3.06 in) long feet; they weighed 1.273–1.3 kg (2.81–2.87 lb).

== Taxonomy ==
- B. c. crassicauda, central Mozambique, Malawi and Zambia
- B. c. nigrescens, Central Kenya (Nairobi)
- B. c. puisa, northern Mozambique and southern Tanzania
- B. c. tenuis

=== Phylogeny ===
The bushy tailed mongoose is closely related to the black-footed mongoose (Bdeogale nigripes). Perez's study of genes within the family Herpestidae showed the genus Bdeogale is monophyletic. Close cousins of this clade include the genera Ichneumia and Cynictis.

== Distribution and habitat ==
Because of the bushy-tailed mongoose's size and stealthiness, its range is not completely known. Although, it apparently prefers locations near rivers that provide cover. The bushy-tailed mongoose inhabits foremost open shrubland and multilayered forest. These habitats vary little in temperature and humidity. In northern Tanzania, the bushy-tailed mongoose was recorded in more than 31 camera trap locations in Ngorongoro Conservation Area, Biharamulo-Burigi-Kimisi Game Reserve and Mahale Mountains National Park, mostly in Acacia woodlands and riparian zones.

== Conservation ==
The bushy-tailed mongoose is listed as Least Concern on the IUCN Red List. It is negatively impacted by habitat degradation and fragmentation, prey depletion and land use dynamics caused by cattle grazing.
