= Grauer's large-headed shrew =

Conservation status
- Data Deficient (IUCN 3.1)

Scientific classification
- Kingdom: Animalia
- Phylum: Chordata
- Class: Mammalia
- Order: Eulipotyphla
- Family: Soricidae
- Genus: Paracrocidura
- Species: P. graueri

Binomial name
- Paracrocidura graueri Hutterer, 1986
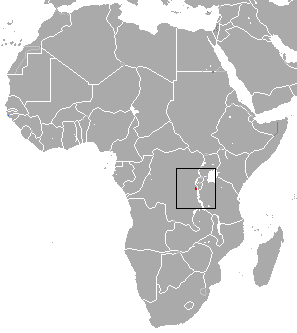
- Grauer's large-headed shrew range

Species of mammal

Grauer's large-headed shrew (Paracrocidura graueri) is a species of mammal in the family Soricidae. It is endemic to the Democratic Republic of the Congo. Its natural habitat is subtropical or tropical moist montane forests.
