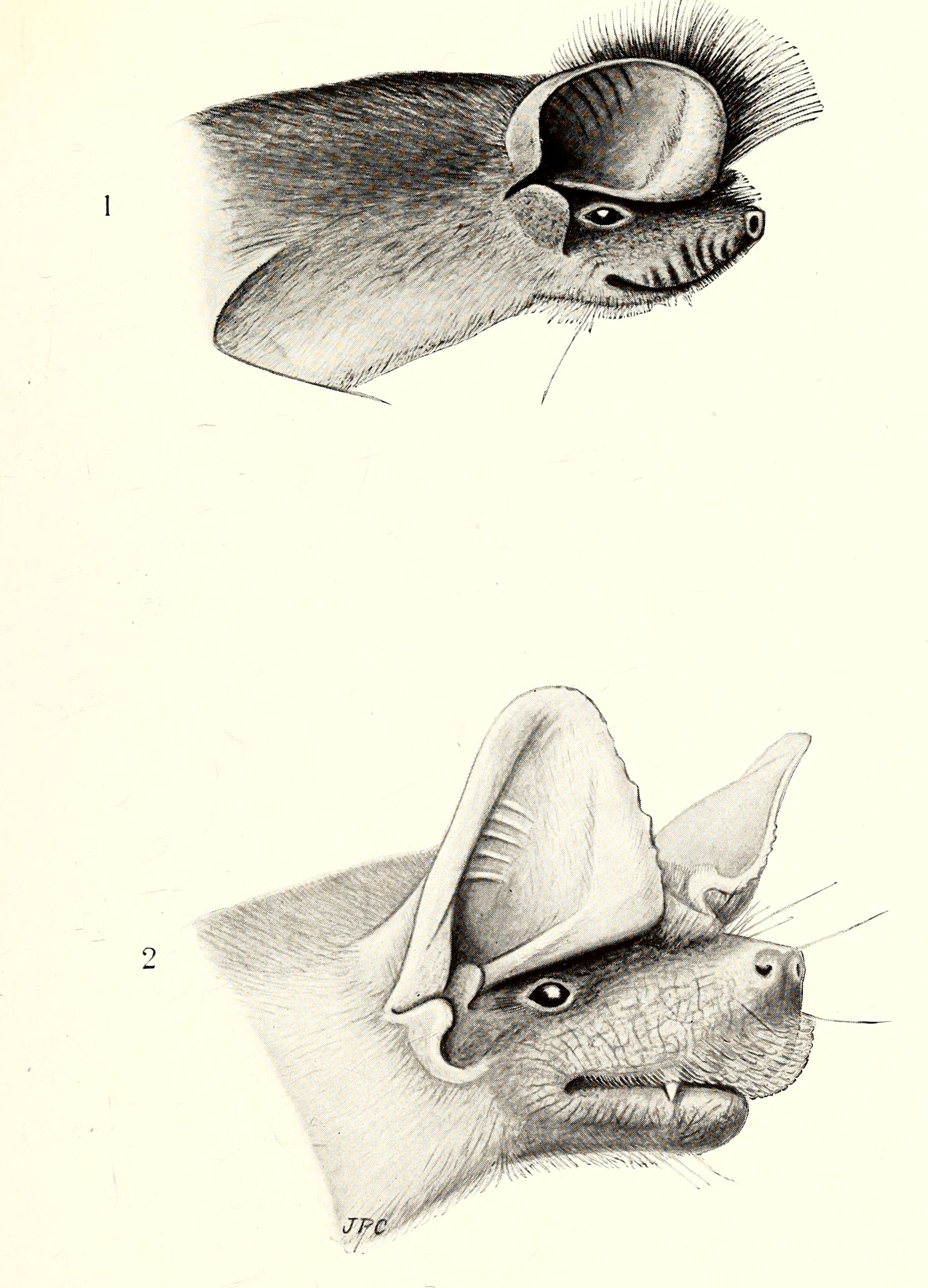

Scientific classification
- Domain: Eukaryota
- Kingdom: Animalia
- Phylum: Chordata
- Class: Mammalia
- Order: Chiroptera
- Family: Molossidae
- Genus: Myopterus; E. Geoffroy, 1818

Type species
- Myopterus senegalensis Oken, 1816

Species
- Myopterus daubentonii Myopterus whitleyi

= Myopterus =

Genus of bats

African free-tailed bats (Myopterus) are a genus of bat in the family Molossidae. It contains the following species:

- Daubenton's free-tailed bat (Myopterus daubentonii)
- Bini free-tailed bat (Myopterus whitleyi)
