= Crocidura grandiceps =

Conservation status
- Least Concern (IUCN 3.1)

Scientific classification
- Kingdom: Animalia
- Phylum: Chordata
- Class: Mammalia
- Order: Eulipotyphla
- Family: Soricidae
- Genus: Crocidura
- Species: C. grandiceps

Binomial name
- Crocidura grandiceps Hutterer, 1983
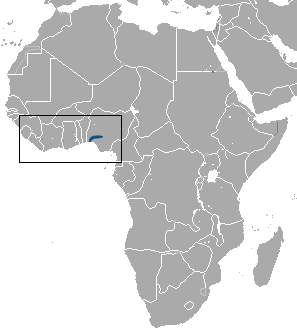
- Large-headed shrew range

Species of mammal

Crocidura grandiceps, commonly known as the large-headed forest shrew or the large-headed white-toothed shrew, is a species of mammal in the family Soricidae. It is found in Benin, Ivory Coast, Ghana, Guinea, Liberia, Nigeria, and Togo. Its natural habitat is subtropical or tropical moist lowland forests. It is threatened by habitat loss due to agriculture and aquaculture as well as logging and wood harvesting. To increase habitat protection for C. grandiceps, in-place land/water protection conservation actions are in place. The vernacular name large-headed shrew is sometimes applied to C. grandiceps but has also been used for the entire related genus Paracrocidura. The IUCN List categorizes C. grandiceps as least concern as of 2024.

An adult C. grandiceps is smaller than the size of a human hand and are typically covered in light brown fur. These animals are omnivores as they will eat both plants as well as other animals. The diet of the C. grandiceps consists of a variety of insects, bugs, spiders, beetles, worms, certain fungi and vegetables, and occasionally other small mammals.
