= Black-footed mongoose =

Conservation status
- Least Concern (IUCN 3.1)

Scientific classification
- Kingdom: Animalia
- Phylum: Chordata
- Class: Mammalia
- Order: Carnivora
- Family: Herpestidae
- Genus: Bdeogale
- Species: B. nigripes

Binomial name
- Bdeogale nigripes Pucheran, 1855
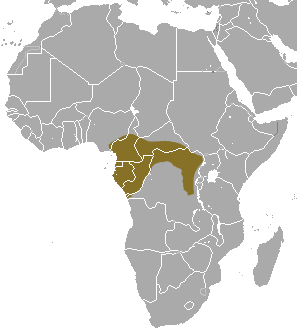
- Black-footed mongoose range

Species of mongoose from Central Africa

The black-footed mongoose (Bdeogale nigripes), also called the black-legged mongoose, is a mongoose species native to Central Africa, where it inhabits deep deciduous forests from eastern Nigeria to the southern Democratic Republic of the Congo. It has been listed as Least Concern on the IUCN Red List since 2008. It is omnivorous and feeds on ants, termites, Orthoptera, small rodents, frogs, lizards and fruits. It is mostly solitary and nocturnal.

Results of genetic and morphological analyses indicate that the black-footed mongoose is closely related to Jackson's mongoose, which is considered conspecific.

== Physical characteristics ==
Black-footed mongoose have a blunt muzzle and short limbs. They have a grayish-brown grizzled coat with black legs. Their coat consists of long coarse guard hairs with a soft undercoat. Adults have a 375-to-600-millimetre (14.8 to 23.6 in) body length, stand 175 to 375 millimetres (6.9 to 14.8 in) high at the shoulders, and have a 6.8-to-14.7-inch (170 to 370 mm) long tail. Adults weigh between 900 and 3,000 grams (2.0 and 6.6 lb).
