= Paracrocidura =

Large-headed shrews

Scientific classification
- Kingdom: Animalia
- Phylum: Chordata
- Class: Mammalia
- Order: Eulipotyphla
- Family: Soricidae
- Subfamily: Crocidurinae
- Genus: Paracrocidura de Balsac, 1956

Type species
- Paracrocidura schoutedeni Heim de Balsac, 1956

Species
- See text

Genus of mammals

Paracrocidura is a genus of shrews. They are mammals in the family Soricidae. The vernacular name large-headed shrews is sometimes collectively applied to the genus, but has also been applied to the species Crocidura grandiceps.

The genus contains the following species:

- Grauer's large-headed shrew (Paracrocidura graueri)
- Greater large-headed shrew (Paracrocidura maxima)
- Lesser large-headed shrew (Paracrocidura schoutedeni)
