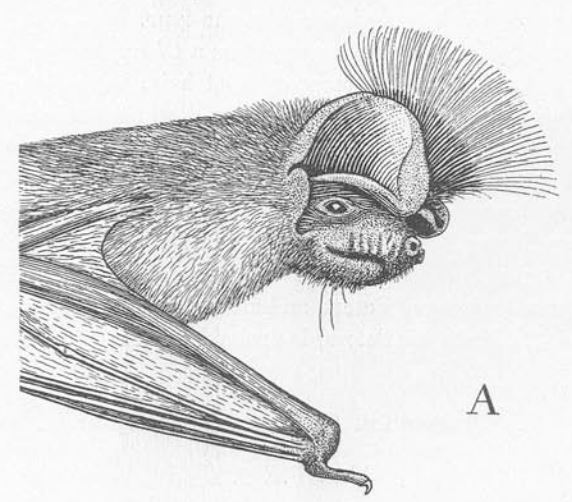

Conservation status
- Least Concern (IUCN 3.1)

Scientific classification
- Kingdom: Animalia
- Phylum: Chordata
- Class: Mammalia
- Order: Chiroptera
- Family: Molossidae
- Genus: Mops
- Species: M. chapini

Binomial name
- Mops chapini J.A. Allen, 1917

Synonyms
- Tadarida chapini

= Chapin's free-tailed bat =

Species of bat

Chapin's free-tailed bat (Mops chapini) is a species of bat in the family Molossidae. It is found in central and southern Africa.

== Description ==
Chapin's free-tailed bat is a relatively small species, measuring 8 to 12 cm (3.1 to 4.7 in) in length, including a 3 cm (1.2 in) tail, and weighing around 10 g (0.35 oz). The body has pale cinnamon-brown or greyish fur that fades to near-white towards the middle of the belly. The wings are white or pale brown in colour. A distinctive crest of hair rises from a small lappet between the ears. This is relatively small and bland in females, but is three times larger, at up to 15 mm (0.59 in) long, and striking bi-coloured in males, being reddish chestnut at the base, and whitish above. The crest is especially well developed in breeding males, and helps to disperse scent from a gland at its base.

== Biology and habitat ==
Chapin's free-tailed bat is found across much of central and southern Africa, between Ethiopia and South Sudan in the northeast, the Republic of the Congo in the northwest, and northern Namibia, Botswana, and Zimbabwe in the south. An isolated population is also known from Ghana and the Ivory Coast. Within this region it inhabits savannah habitats, river valleys and woodland.

The bat is insectivorous, feeding in flight. Its echolocation calls last five to ten milliseconds, and sweep from 27 down to 19 kHz.
