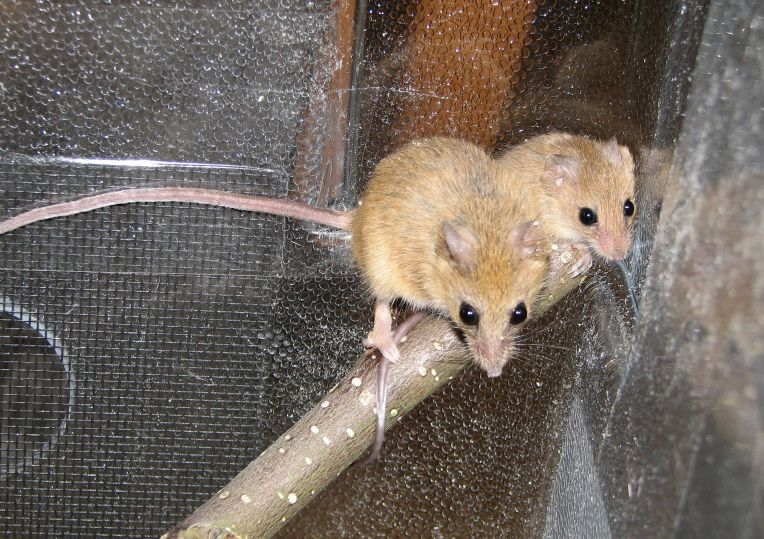
- Chestnut climbing mouse, (Dendromus mystacalis)

Scientific classification
- Kingdom: Animalia
- Phylum: Chordata
- Class: Mammalia
- Order: Rodentia
- Family: Nesomyidae
- Subfamily: Dendromurinae; Alston, 1876

Genera
- Dendromus; Dendroprionomys; Malacothrix; Megadendromus; Prionomys; Steatomys

= Dendromurinae =

Dendromurines Temporal range: Middle Miocene - recent

Subfamily of rodents

Dendromurinae is a subfamily of rodents in the family Nesomyidae and superfamily Muroidea. The dendromurines are currently restricted to Africa, as is the case for all extant members of the family Nesomyidae. The authorship of the subfamily has been attributed to both Alston, 1876, and (incorrectly) to G. M. Allen, 1939.

Two genera, Dendromus and Steatomys, are relatively common throughout most of sub-Saharan Africa. The remaining genera are relatively rare and have restricted geographic distributions.

The link rat, Deomys ferugineus, has been traditionally placed in this subfamily, but molecular phylogenetic studies have shown that it is more related to the spiny mice, genus Acomys. The link rat is now placed in the family Muridae and subfamily Deomyinae. Only two of the currently recognized dendromurine genera, Dendromus and Steatomys, have been studied in molecular analyses. Considering how distinct these genera are from one another, the placement of all other dendromurine genera should be considered tentative pending closer examination. Another rare genus of "dendromurines", Leimacomys, has recently been placed in a new subfamily (Leimacomyinae) in the family Muridae (Musser and Carleton, 2005).

Fossils attributed to the Dendromurinae are known from Asia as early as 15 million years ago. It has been thought that dendromurines invaded Africa from there and became extinct in Asia due to competition with other muroids. The same may be holding true at present in Africa as the dendromurines have declined there since the invasion of murines and other muroids.

The subfamily Dendromurinae contains 6 genera and 25 species.

== Classification ==
Subfamily Dendromurinae - Climbing mice

- Genus Dendromus - Climbing mice
  - Remarkable climbing mouse, Dendromus insignis
  - Mount Kahuzi climbing mouse, Dendromus kahuziensis
  - Monard's African climbing mouse, Dendromus leucostomus
  - Lovat's climbing mouse, Dendromus lovati
  - Gray climbing mouse, Dendromus melanotis
  - Brants's climbing mouse, Dendromus mesomelas
  - Banana climbing mouse, Dendromus messorius
  - Chestnut climbing mouse, Dendromus mystacalis
  - Kivu climbing mouse, Dendromus nyasae (kivu)
  - Nyika climbing mouse, Dendromus nyikae
  - Cameroon climbing mouse, Dendromus oreas
  - Dendromus ruppi
  - Vernay's climbing mouse, Dendromus vernayi
- Genus Megadendromus
  - Nikolaus's mouse, Megadendromus nikolausi
- Genus Dendroprionomys
  - Velvet climbing mouse, Dendroprionomys rousseloti
- Genus Prionomys
  - Dollman's climbing mouse, Prionomys batesi
- Genus Malacothrix
  - Gerbil mouse, Malacothrix typica
- Genus Steatomys - Fat mice
  - Bocage's African fat mouse, Steatomys bocagei
  - Northwestern fat mouse, Steatomys caurinus
  - Dainty fat mouse, Steatomys cuppedius
  - Jackson's fat mouse, Steatomys jacksoni
  - Kreb's fat mouse, Steatomys krebsii
  - Pousargues's African fat mouse, Steatomys opimus
  - Tiny fat mouse, Steatomys parvus
  - Fat mouse, Steatomys pratensis
