= List of mammals of Zambia =

This is a list of the mammal species recorded in Zambia. Of the 237 mammal species in Zambia, one is critically endangered, three are endangered, eight are vulnerable, and fourteen are near threatened.

The following tags are used to highlight each species' conservation status as assessed by the International Union for Conservation of Nature:

EX	Extinct	No reasonable doubt that the last individual has died.
EW	Extinct in the wild	Known only to survive in captivity or as a naturalized populations well outside its previous range.
CR	Critically endangered	The species is in imminent risk of extinction in the wild.
EN	Endangered	The species is facing an extremely high risk of extinction in the wild.
VU	Vulnerable	The species is facing a high risk of extinction in the wild.
NT	Near threatened	The species does not meet any of the criteria that would categorise it as risking extinction but it is likely to do so in the future.
LC	Least concern	There are no current identifiable risks to the species.
DD	Data deficient	There is inadequate information to make an assessment of the risks to this species.

Some species were assessed using an earlier set of criteria. Species assessed using this system have the following instead of near threatened and least concern categories:

LR/cd	Lower risk/conservation dependent	Species which were the focus of conservation programmes and may have moved into a higher risk category if that programme was discontinued.
LR/nt	Lower risk/near threatened	Species which are close to being classified as vulnerable but are not the subject of conservation programmes.
LR/lc	Lower risk/least concern	Species for which there are no identifiable risks.

== Order: Macroscelidea (elephant shrews) ==
Often called sengis, the elephant shrews or jumping shrews are native to southern Africa. Their common English name derives from their elongated flexible snout and their resemblance to the true shrews.

- Family: Macroscelididae (elephant shrews)
  - Genus: Elephantulus
    - Short-snouted elephant shrew, Elephantulus brachyrhynchus LC
    - Dusky elephant shrew, Elephantulus fuscus DD
  - Genus: Petrodromus
    - Four-toed elephant shrew, Petrodromus tetradactylus LC
  - Genus: Rhynchocyon
    - Checkered elephant shrew, R. cirnei LC

== Order: Tubulidentata (aardvarks) ==
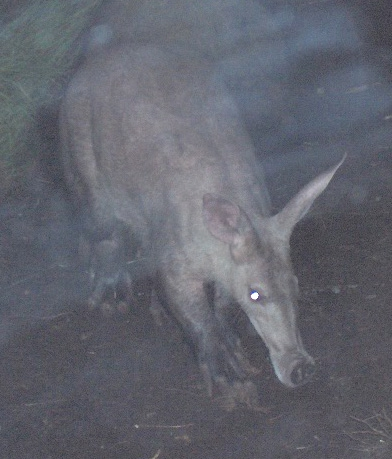
Aardvark

The order Tubulidentata consists of a single species, the aardvark. Tubulidentata are characterised by their teeth which lack a pulp cavity and form thin tubes which are continuously worn down and replaced.

- Family: Orycteropodidae
  - Genus: Orycteropus
    - Aardvark, O. afer LC

== Order: Hyracoidea (hyraxes) ==
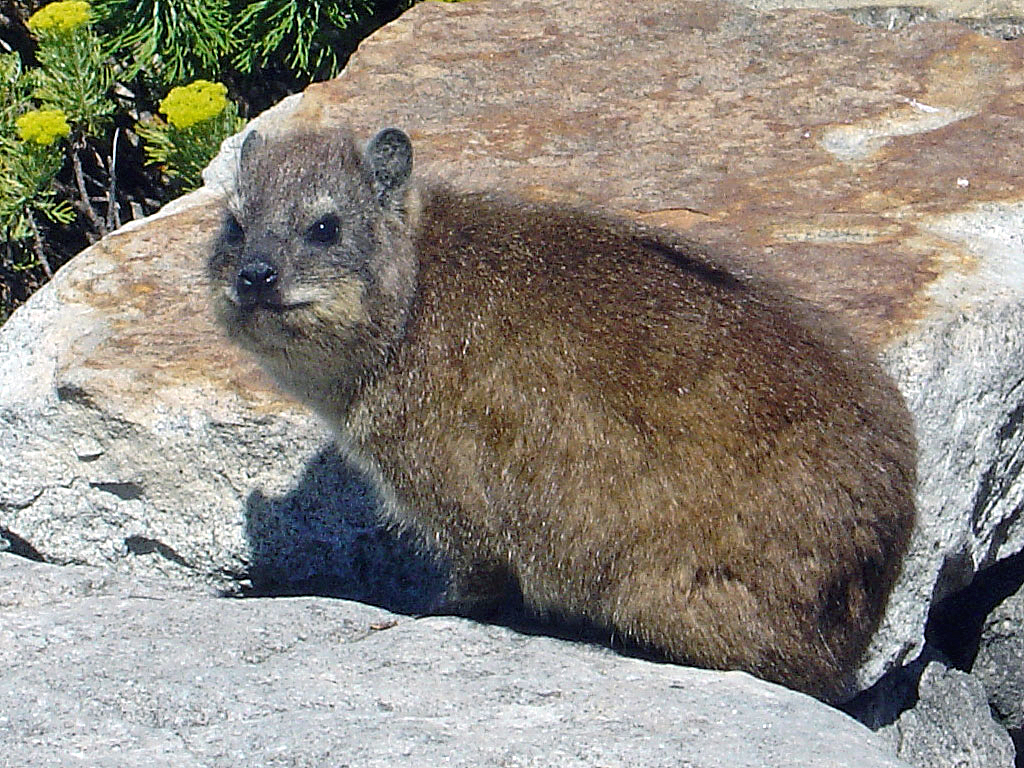
Cape hyrax

The hyraxes are any of four species of fairly small, thickset, herbivorous mammals in the order Hyracoidea. About the size of a domestic cat they are well-furred, with rounded bodies and a stumpy tail. They are native to Africa and the Middle East.

- Family: Procaviidae (hyraxes)
  - Genus: Heterohyrax
    - Yellow-spotted rock hyrax, Heterohyrax brucei LC
  - Genus: Procavia
    - Cape hyrax, Procavia capensis LC

== Order: Proboscidea (elephants) ==
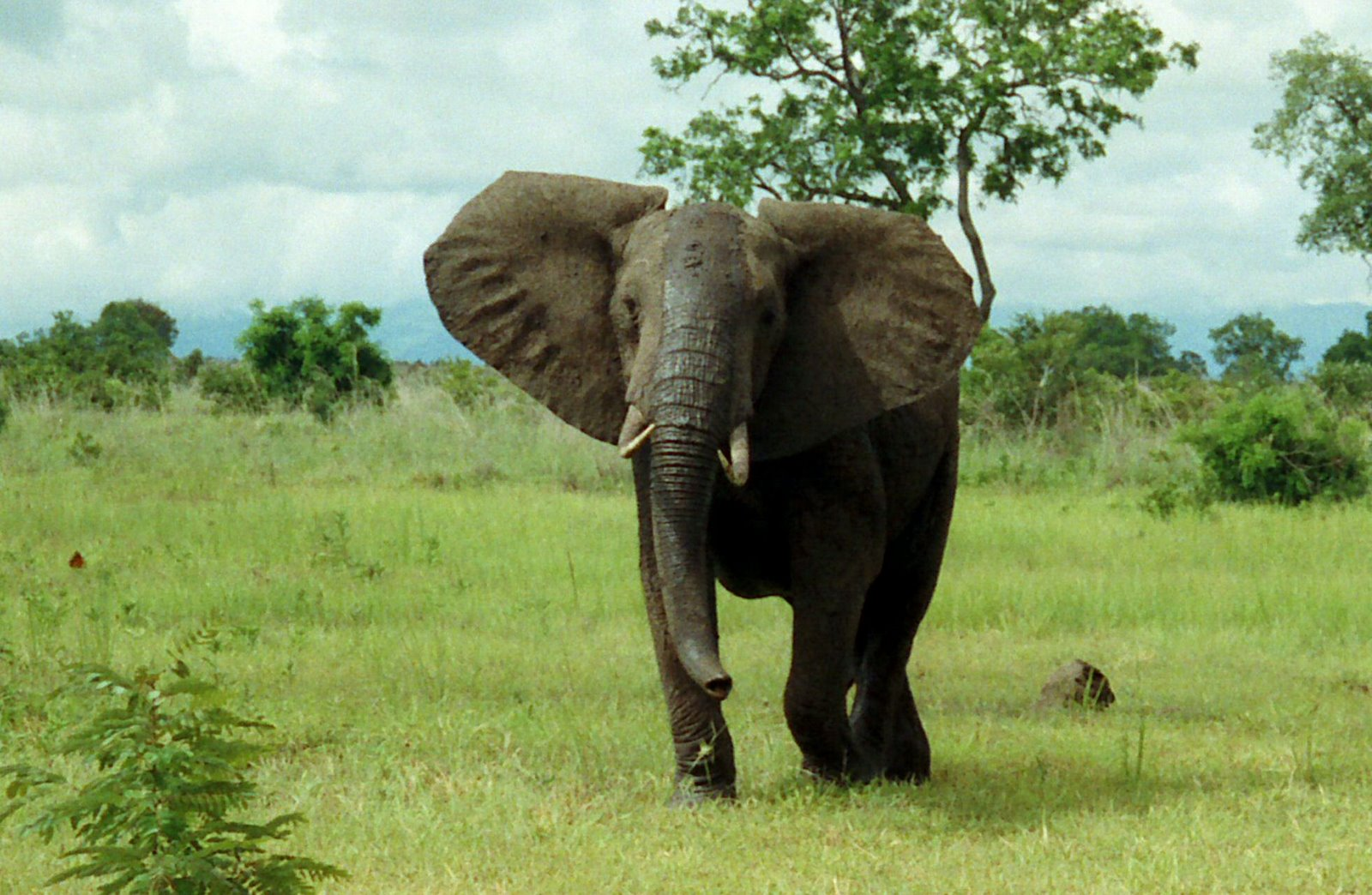
African bush elephant

The elephants comprise three living species and are the largest living land animals.

- Family: Elephantidae (elephants)
  - Genus: Loxodonta
    - African bush elephant, L. africana EN

== Order: Primates ==
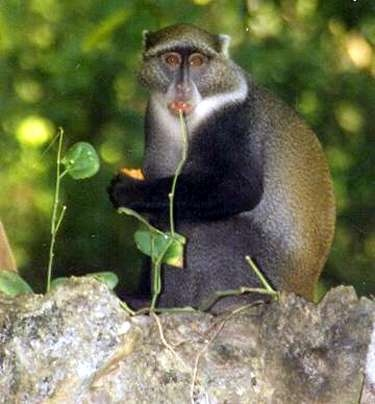
Blue monkey

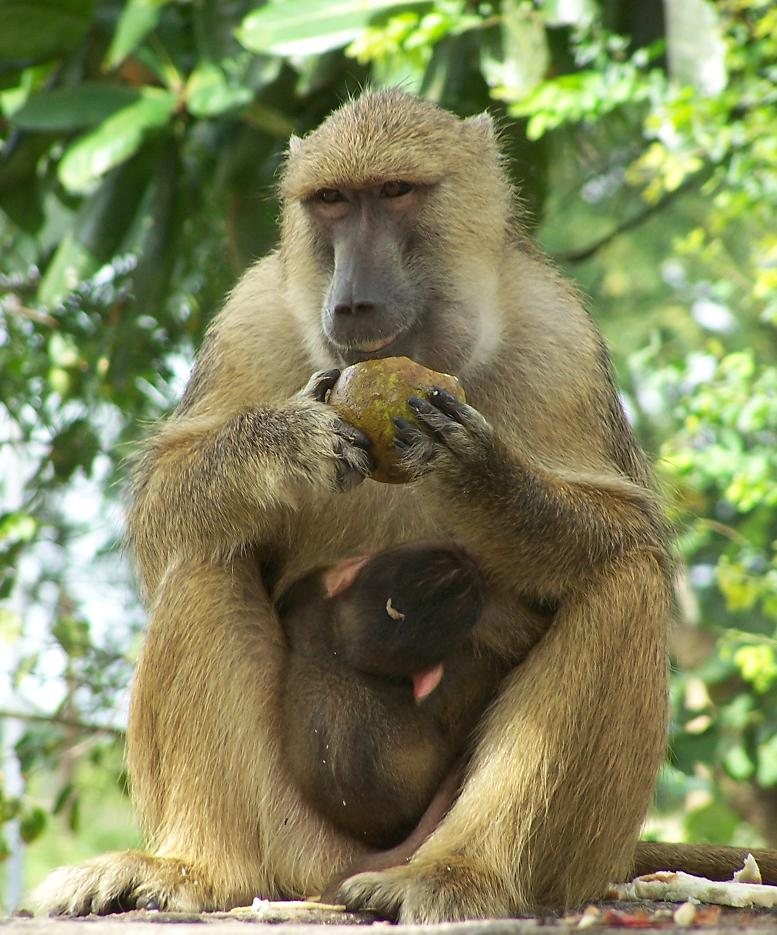
Yellow baboon

The order Primates contains humans and their closest relatives: lemurs, lorisoids, tarsiers, monkeys, and apes.

- Suborder: Strepsirrhini
  - Infraorder: Lemuriformes
    - Superfamily: Lorisoidea
      - Family: Galagidae
        - Genus: Galago
          - Mohol bushbaby, Galago moholi LR/lc
        - Genus: Otolemur
          - Brown greater galago, Otolemur crassicaudatus LR/lc
- Suborder: Haplorhini
  - Infraorder: Simiiformes
    - Parvorder: Catarrhini
      - Superfamily: Cercopithecoidea
        - Genus: Chlorocebus
          - Vervet monkey, Cercopithecus pygerythrus LR/lc
          - Malbrouck, Cercopithecus cynosuros LR/lc
        - Family: Cercopithecidae (Old World monkeys)
          - Genus: Cercopithecus
            - Red-tailed monkey, Cercopithecus ascanius LR/lc
            - Blue monkey, Cercopithecus mitis LR/lc
          - Genus: Papio
            - Yellow baboon, Papio cynocephalus LR/lc
            - Chacma baboon, Papio ursinus LR/lc
          - Subfamily: Colobinae
            - Genus: Colobus
              - Angola colobus, Colobus angolensis LR/lc

== Order: Rodentia (rodents) ==
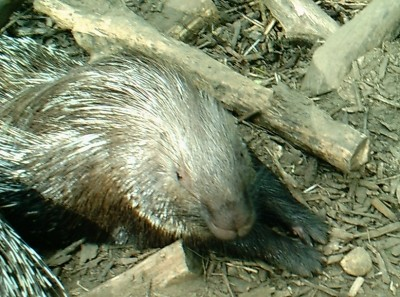
Cape porcupine

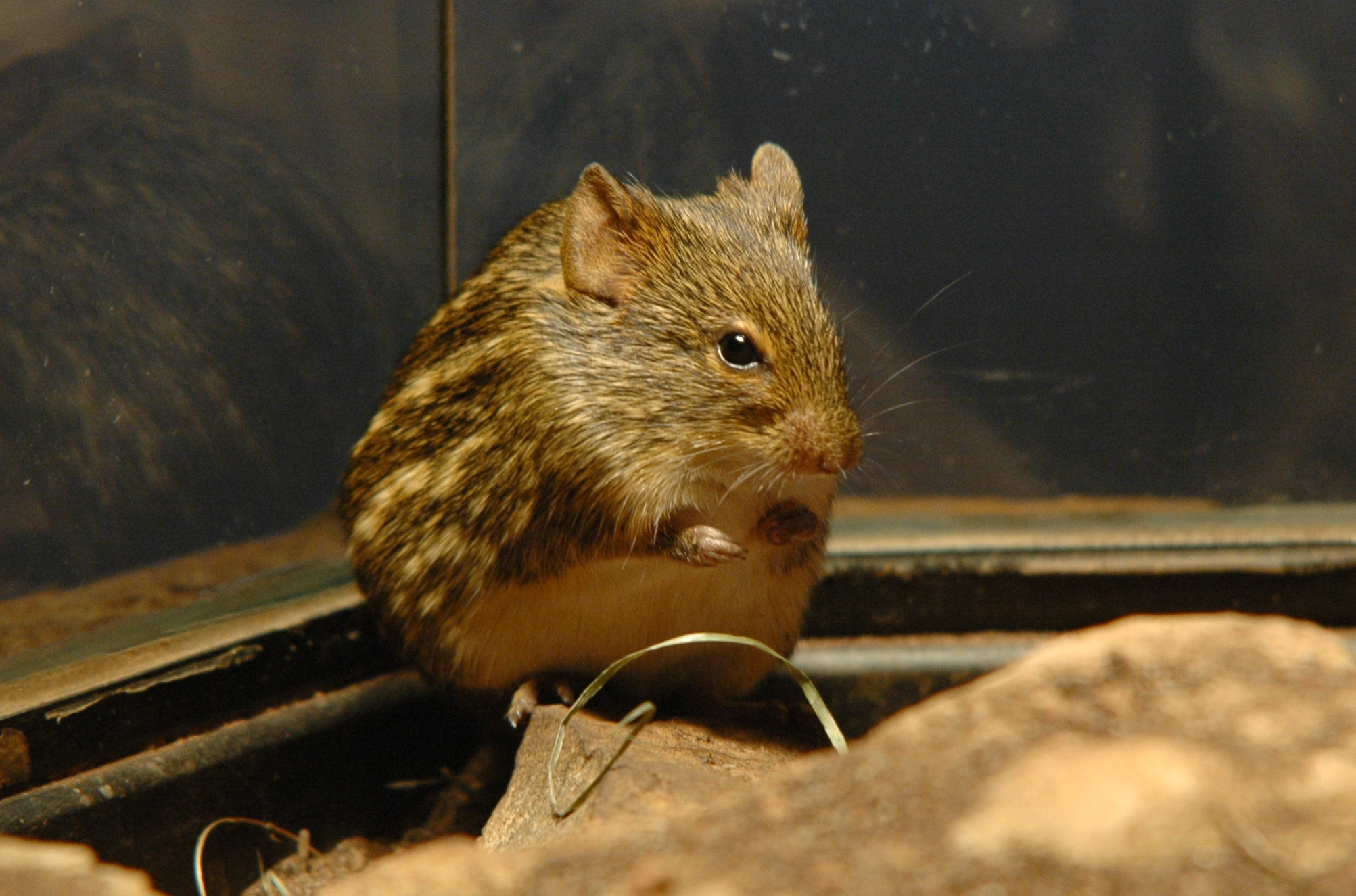
Typical striped grass mouse

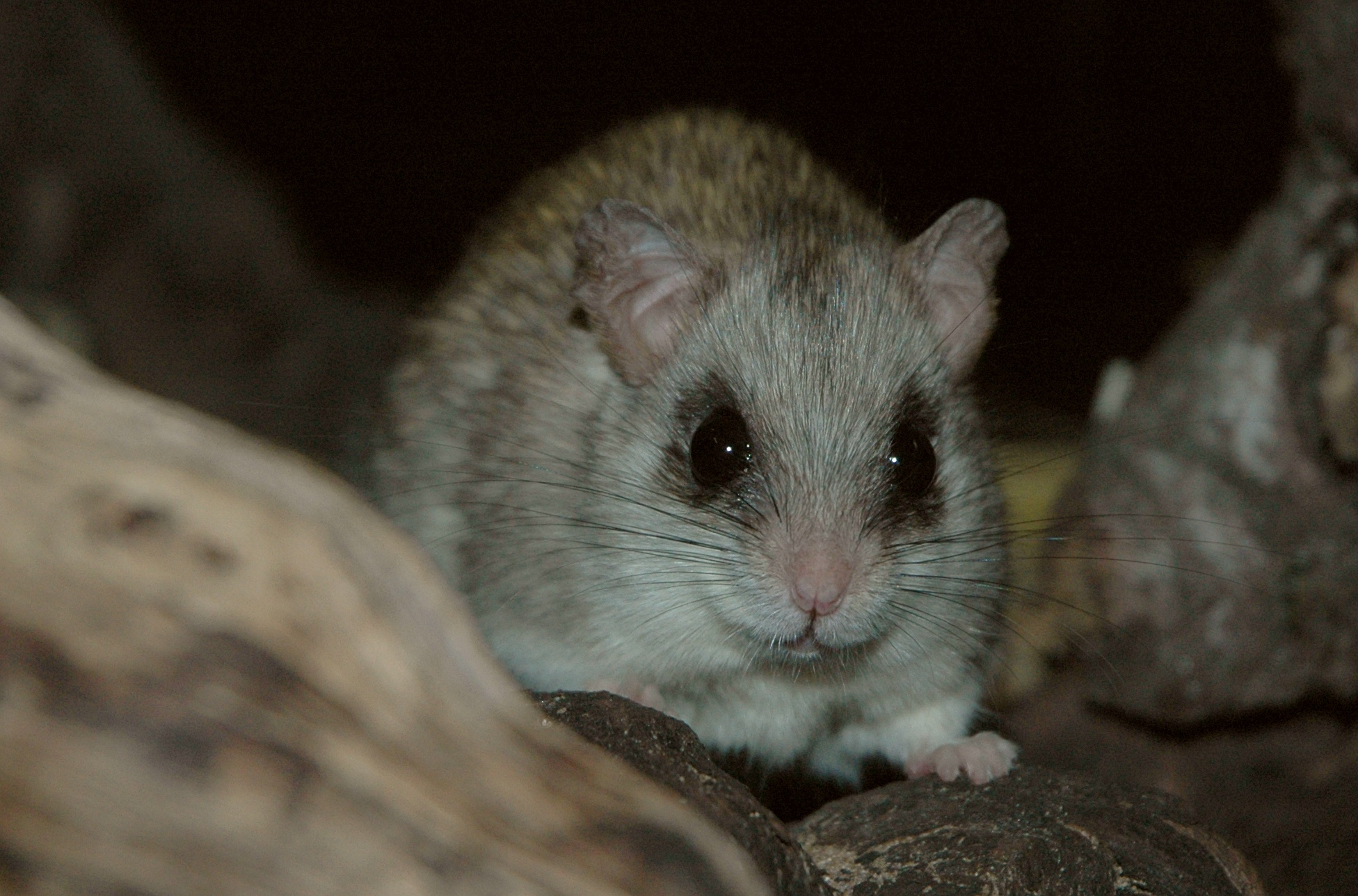
Acacia rat

Rodents make up the largest order of mammals, with over 40% of mammalian species. They have two incisors in the upper and lower jaw which grow continually and must be kept short by gnawing. Most rodents are small though the capybara can weigh up to 45 kg (99 lb).

- Suborder: Hystricognathi
  - Family: Bathyergidae
    - Genus: Cryptomys
      - Ansell's mole-rat, Cryptomys anselli NT
      - Bocage's mole-rat, Cryptomys bocagei DD
      - Damaraland mole-rat, Cryptomys damarensis LC
      - Common mole-rat, Cryptomys hottentotus LC
      - Kafue mole-rat, Cryptomys kafuensis VU
      - Mechow's mole-rat, Cryptomys mechowi LC
  - Family: Hystricidae (Old World porcupines)
    - Genus: Hystrix
      - Cape porcupine, Hystrix africaeaustralis LC
  - Family: Thryonomyidae (cane rats)
    - Genus: Thryonomys
      - Lesser cane rat, Thryonomys gregorianus LC
      - Greater cane rat, Thryonomys swinderianus LC
- Suborder: Sciurognathi
  - Family: Anomaluridae
    - Subfamily: Anomalurinae
      - Genus: Anomalurus
        - Lord Derby's scaly-tailed squirrel, Anomalurus derbianus LC
      - Genus: Anomalurops
        - Beecroft's scaly-tailed squirrel, Anomalurops beecrofti LC
  - Family: Pedetidae (spring hare)
    - Genus: Pedetes
      - Springhare, Pedetes capensis LC
  - Family: Sciuridae (squirrels)
    - Subfamily: Xerinae
      - Tribe: Protoxerini
        - Genus: Heliosciurus
          - Gambian sun squirrel, Heliosciurus gambianus LC
          - Mutable sun squirrel, Heliosciurus mutabilis LC
        - Genus: Paraxerus
          - Boehm's bush squirrel, Paraxerus boehmi LC
          - Smith's bush squirrel, Paraxerus cepapi LC
          - Black and red bush squirrel, Paraxerus lucifer DD
  - Family: Gliridae (dormice)
    - Subfamily: Graphiurinae
      - Genus: Graphiurus
        - Johnston's African dormouse, Graphiurus johnstoni DD
        - Small-eared dormouse, Graphiurus microtis LC
        - Monard's dormouse, Graphiurus monardi DD
        - Rock dormouse, Graphiurus platyops LC
  - Family: Nesomyidae
    - Subfamily: Dendromurinae
      - Genus: Dendromus
        - Gray climbing mouse, Dendromus melanotis LC
        - Brants's climbing mouse, Dendromus mesomelas LC
        - Chestnut climbing mouse, Dendromus mystacalis LC
        - Nyika climbing mouse, Dendromus nyikae LC
      - Genus: Steatomys
        - Kreb's fat mouse, Steatomys krebsii LC
        - Tiny fat mouse, Steatomys parvus LC
        - Fat mouse, Steatomys pratensis LC
    - Subfamily: Cricetomyinae
      - Genus: Beamys
        - Greater hamster-rat, Beamys major NT
      - Genus: Cricetomys
        - Gambian pouched rat, Cricetomys gambianus LC
      - Genus: Saccostomus
        - South African pouched mouse, Saccostomus campestris LC
  - Family: Muridae (mice, rats, voles, gerbils, hamsters, etc.)
    - Subfamily: Deomyinae
      - Genus: Acomys
        - Spiny mouse, Acomys spinosissimus LC
      - Genus: Lophuromys
        - Yellow-spotted brush-furred rat, Lophuromys flavopunctatus LC
    - Subfamily: Otomyinae
      - Genus: Otomys
        - Angoni vlei rat, Otomys angoniensis LC
        - Dent's vlei rat, Otomys denti NT
        - Large vlei rat, Otomys maximus LC
        - Uzungwe vlei rat, Otomys uzungwensis EN
    - Subfamily: Gerbillinae
      - Genus: Tatera
        - Boehm's gerbil, Tatera boehmi LC
        - Highveld gerbil, Tatera brantsii LC
        - Bushveld gerbil, Tatera leucogaster LC
        - Savanna gerbil, Tatera valida LC
    - Subfamily: Murinae
      - Genus: Aethomys
        - Red rock rat, Aethomys chrysophilus LC
        - Kaiser's rock rat, Aethomys kaiseri LC
        - Namaqua rock rat, Aethomys namaquensis LC
        - Nyika rock rat, Aethomys nyikae LC
      - Genus: Arvicanthis
        - African grass rat, Arvicanthis niloticus LC
      - Genus: Colomys
        - African wading rat, Colomys goslingi LC
      - Genus: Dasymys
        - African marsh rat, Dasymys incomtus LC
        - Angolan marsh rat, Dasymys nudipes NT
      - Genus: Grammomys
        - Woodland thicket rat, Grammomys dolichurus LC
        - Ruwenzori thicket rat, Grammomys ibeanus LC
      - Genus: Hybomys
        - Peters's striped mouse, Hybomys univittatus LC
      - Genus: Hylomyscus
        - Montane wood mouse, Hylomyscus denniae LC
      - Genus: Lemniscomys
        - Griselda's striped grass mouse, Lemniscomys griselda LC
        - Single-striped grass mouse, Lemniscomys rosalia LC
        - Rosevear's striped grass mouse, Lemniscomys roseveari DD
        - Typical striped grass mouse, Lemniscomys striatus LC
      - Genus: Malacomys
        - Big-eared swamp rat, Malacomys longipes LC
      - Genus: Mastomys
        - Natal multimammate mouse, Mastomys natalensis LC
      - Genus: Mus
        - Desert pygmy mouse, Mus indutus LC
        - African pygmy mouse, Mus minutoides LC
        - Neave's mouse, Mus neavei DD
        - Setzer's pygmy mouse, Mus setzeri LC
        - Gray-bellied pygmy mouse, Mus triton LC
      - Genus: Pelomys
        - Creek groove-toothed swamp rat, Pelomys fallax LC
        - Least groove-toothed swamp rat, Pelomys minor LC
      - Genus: Praomys
        - Delectable soft-furred mouse, Praomys delectorum NT
        - Jackson's soft-furred mouse, Praomys jacksoni LC
      - Genus: Rhabdomys
        - Four-striped grass mouse, Rhabdomys pumilio LC
      - Genus: Thallomys
        - Black-tailed tree rat, Thallomys nigricauda LC
        - Acacia rat, Thallomys paedulcus LC
      - Genus: Zelotomys
        - Hildegarde's broad-headed mouse, Zelotomys hildegardeae LC

== Order: Lagomorpha (lagomorphs) ==
The lagomorphs comprise two families, Leporidae (hares and rabbits), and Ochotonidae (pikas). Though they can resemble rodents, and were classified as a superfamily in that order until the early twentieth century, they have since been considered a separate order. They differ from rodents in a number of physical characteristics, such as having four incisors in the upper jaw rather than two.

- Family: Leporidae (rabbits, hares)
  - Genus: Pronolagus
    - Smith's red rock hare, Pronolagus rupestris LR/lc
  - Genus: Lepus
    - Cape hare, Lepus capensis LR/lc
    - African savanna hare, Lepus microtis LR/lc

== Order: Soricomorpha (shrews, moles, and solenodons) ==
The "shrew-forms" are insectivorous mammals. The shrews and solenodons closely resemble mice while the moles are stout-bodied burrowers.

- Family: Soricidae (shrews)
  - Subfamily: Crocidurinae
    - Genus: Crocidura
      - Ansell's shrew, Crocidura ansellorum EN
      - Reddish-gray musk shrew, Crocidura cyanea LC
      - Bicolored musk shrew, Crocidura fuscomurina LC
      - Lesser red musk shrew, Crocidura hirta LC
      - Moonshine shrew, Crocidura luna LC
      - Swamp musk shrew, Crocidura mariquensis LC
      - African black shrew, Crocidura nigrofusca LC
      - African giant shrew, Crocidura olivieri LC
      - Small-footed shrew, Crocidura parvipes LC
      - Pitman's shrew, Crocidura pitmani DD
      - Lesser gray-brown musk shrew, Crocidura silacea LC
      - Turbo shrew, Crocidura turba LC
    - Genus: Suncus
      - Greater dwarf shrew, Suncus lixus LC
      - Lesser dwarf shrew, Suncus varilla LC
    - Genus: Sylvisorex
      - Climbing shrew, Sylvisorex megalura LC

== Order: Chiroptera (bats) ==
The bats' most distinguishing feature is that their forelimbs are developed as wings, making them the only mammals capable of flight. Bat species account for about 20% of all mammals.

- Family: Pteropodidae (flying foxes, Old World fruit bats)
  - Subfamily: Pteropodinae
    - Genus: Eidolon
      - Straw-coloured fruit bat, Eidolon helvum LC
    - Genus: Epomophorus
      - Peters's epauletted fruit bat, Epomophorus crypturus LC
      - Wahlberg's epauletted fruit bat, Epomophorus wahlbergi LC
    - Genus: Epomops
      - Dobson's epauletted fruit bat, Epomops dobsoni LC
      - Franquet's epauletted fruit bat, Epomops franqueti LC
    - Genus: Lissonycteris
      - Angolan rousette, Lissonycteris angolensis LC
      - Harrison's fruit bat, Lissonycteris goliath VU
    - Genus: Micropteropus
      - Peters's dwarf epauletted fruit bat, Micropteropus pusillus LC
    - Genus: Plerotes
      - D'Anchieta's fruit bat, Plerotes anchietae DD
    - Genus: Rousettus
      - Egyptian fruit bat, Rousettus aegyptiacus LC
- Family: Vespertilionidae
  - Subfamily: Kerivoulinae
    - Genus: Kerivoula
      - Damara woolly bat, Kerivoula argentata LC
      - Lesser woolly bat, Kerivoula lanosa LC
  - Subfamily: Myotinae
    - Genus: Myotis
      - Rufous mouse-eared bat, Myotis bocagii LC
      - Cape hairy bat, Myotis tricolor LC
      - Welwitsch's bat, Myotis welwitschii LC
  - Subfamily: Vespertilioninae
    - Genus: Eptesicus
      - Long-tailed house bat, Eptesicus hottentotus LC
    - Genus: Glauconycteris
      - Butterfly bat, Glauconycteris variegata LC
    - Genus: Hypsugo
      - Anchieta's pipistrelle, Hypsugo anchietae LC
    - Genus: Laephotis
      - Botswanan long-eared bat, Laephotis botswanae LC
    - Genus: Mimetillus
      - Moloney's mimic bat, Mimetillus moloneyi LC
    - Genus: Neoromicia
      - Cape serotine, Neoromicia capensis LC
      - Melck's house bat, Neoromicia melckorum DD
      - Banana pipistrelle, Neoromicia nanus LC
      - Rendall's serotine, Neoromicia rendalli LC
      - Zulu serotine, Neoromicia zuluensis LC
    - Genus: Nycticeinops
      - Schlieffen's bat, Nycticeinops schlieffeni LC
    - Genus: Pipistrellus
      - Rüppell's pipistrelle, Pipistrellus rueppelli LC
      - Rusty pipistrelle, Pipistrellus rusticus LC
    - Genus: Scotoecus
      - White-bellied lesser house bat, Scotoecus albigula DD
      - Hinde's lesser house bat, Scotoecus hindei DD
      - Dark-winged lesser house bat, Scotoecus hirundo DD
    - Genus: Scotophilus
      - African yellow bat, Scotophilus dinganii LC
      - White-bellied yellow bat, Scotophilus leucogaster LC
      - Greenish yellow bat, Scotophilus viridis LC
  - Subfamily: Miniopterinae
    - Genus: Miniopterus
      - Lesser long-fingered bat, Miniopterus fraterculus LC
      - Natal long-fingered bat, Miniopterus natalensis NT
- Family: Molossidae
  - Genus: Chaerephon
    - Spotted free-tailed bat, Chaerephon bivittata LC
    - Nigerian free-tailed bat, Chaerephon nigeriae LC
    - Little free-tailed bat, Chaerephon pumila LC
  - Genus: Mops
    - Angolan free-tailed bat, Mops condylurus LC
    - Midas free-tailed bat, Mops midas LC
    - White-bellied free-tailed bat, Mops niveiventer LC
  - Genus: Otomops
    - Large-eared free-tailed bat, Otomops martiensseni NT
  - Genus: Tadarida
    - Egyptian free-tailed bat, Tadarida aegyptiaca LC
    - Madagascan large free-tailed bat, Tadarida fulminans LC
    - African giant free-tailed bat, Tadarida ventralis NT
- Family: Emballonuridae
  - Genus: Taphozous
    - Mauritian tomb bat, Taphozous mauritianus LC
- Family: Nycteridae
  - Genus: Nycteris
    - Andersen's slit-faced bat, Nycteris aurita DD
    - Large slit-faced bat, Nycteris grandis LC
    - Hairy slit-faced bat, Nycteris hispida LC
    - Large-eared slit-faced bat, Nycteris macrotis LC
    - Ja slit-faced bat, Nycteris major VU
    - Egyptian slit-faced bat, Nycteris thebaica LC
    - Wood's slit-faced bat, Nycteris woodi NT
- Family: Megadermatidae
  - Genus: Lavia
    - Yellow-winged bat, Lavia frons LC
- Family: Rhinolophidae
  - Subfamily: Rhinolophinae
    - Genus: Rhinolophus
      - Blasius's horseshoe bat, R. blasii LC
      - Geoffroy's horseshoe bat, Rhinolophus clivosus LC
      - Darling's horseshoe bat, Rhinolophus darlingi LC
      - Rüppell's horseshoe bat, Rhinolophus fumigatus LC
      - Hildebrandt's horseshoe bat, Rhinolophus hildebrandti LC
      - Lander's horseshoe bat, Rhinolophus landeri LC
      - Sakeji horseshoe bat, Rhinolophus sakejiensis DD
      - Bushveld horseshoe bat, Rhinolophus simulator LC
      - Swinny's horseshoe bat, Rhinolophus swinnyi NT
  - Subfamily: Hipposiderinae
    - Genus: Cloeotis
      - Percival's trident bat, Cloeotis percivali VU
    - Genus: Hipposideros
      - Sundevall's roundleaf bat, Hipposideros caffer LC
      - Commerson's roundleaf bat, Hipposideros marungensis NT
      - Noack's roundleaf bat, Hipposideros ruber LC
    - Genus: Triaenops
      - Persian trident bat, Triaenops persicus LC

== Order: Pholidota (pangolins) ==
The order Pholidota comprises the eight species of pangolin. Pangolins are anteaters and have the powerful claws, elongated snout and long tongue seen in the other unrelated anteater species.

- Family: Manidae
  - Genus: Manis
    - Ground pangolin, Manis temminckii LR/nt
    - Tree pangolin, Manis tricuspis LR/lc

== Order: Carnivora (carnivorans) ==
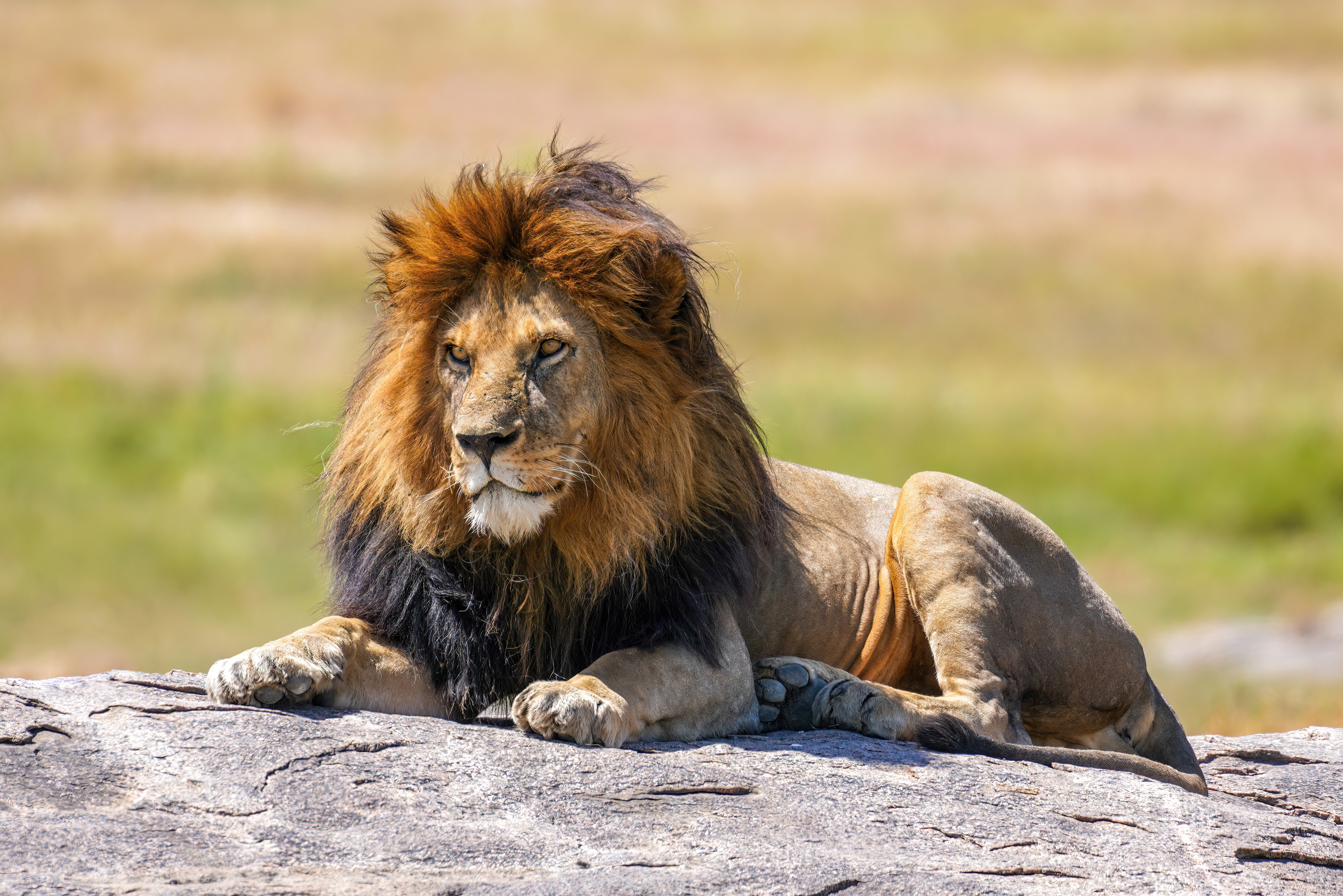
Lion

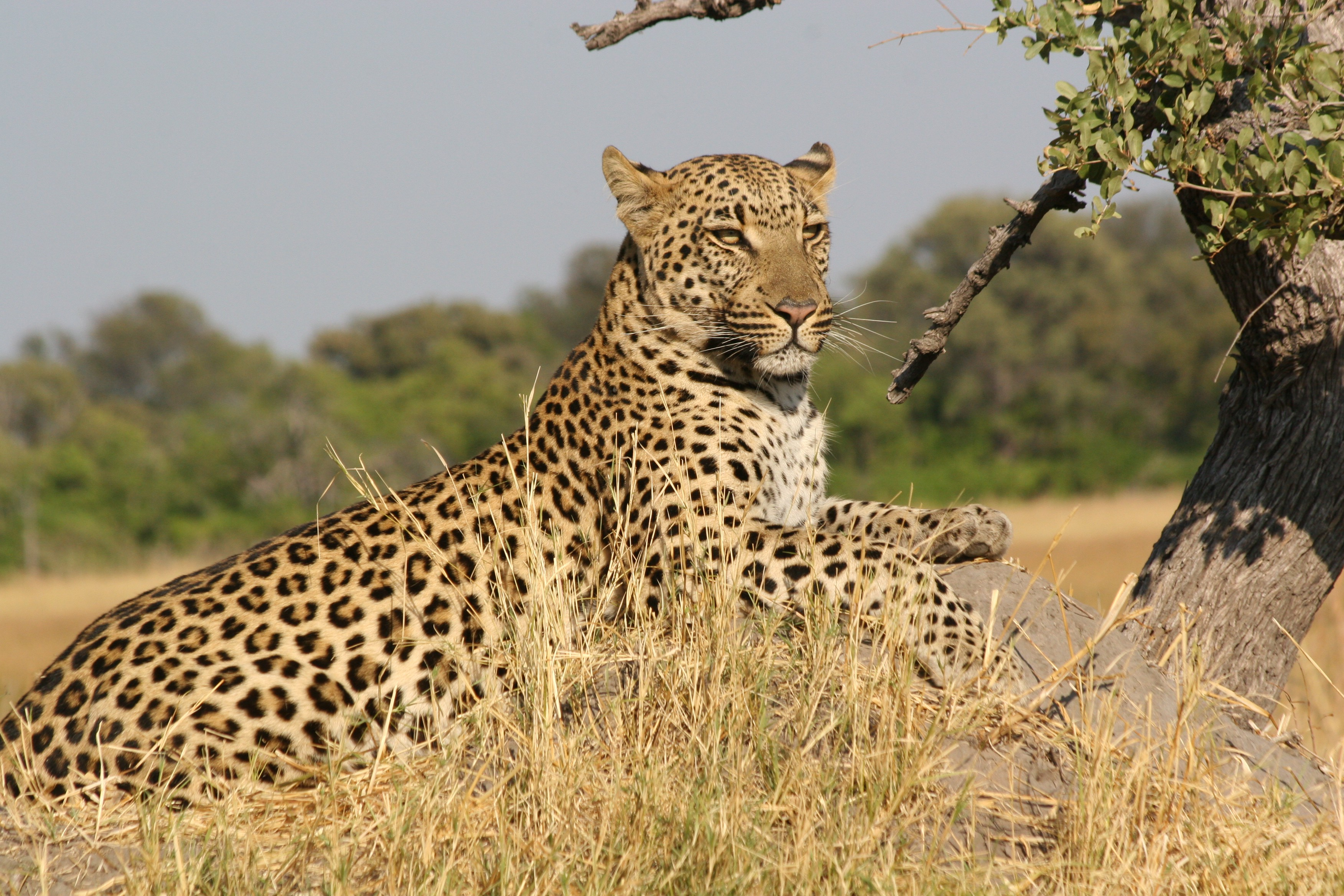
African leopard

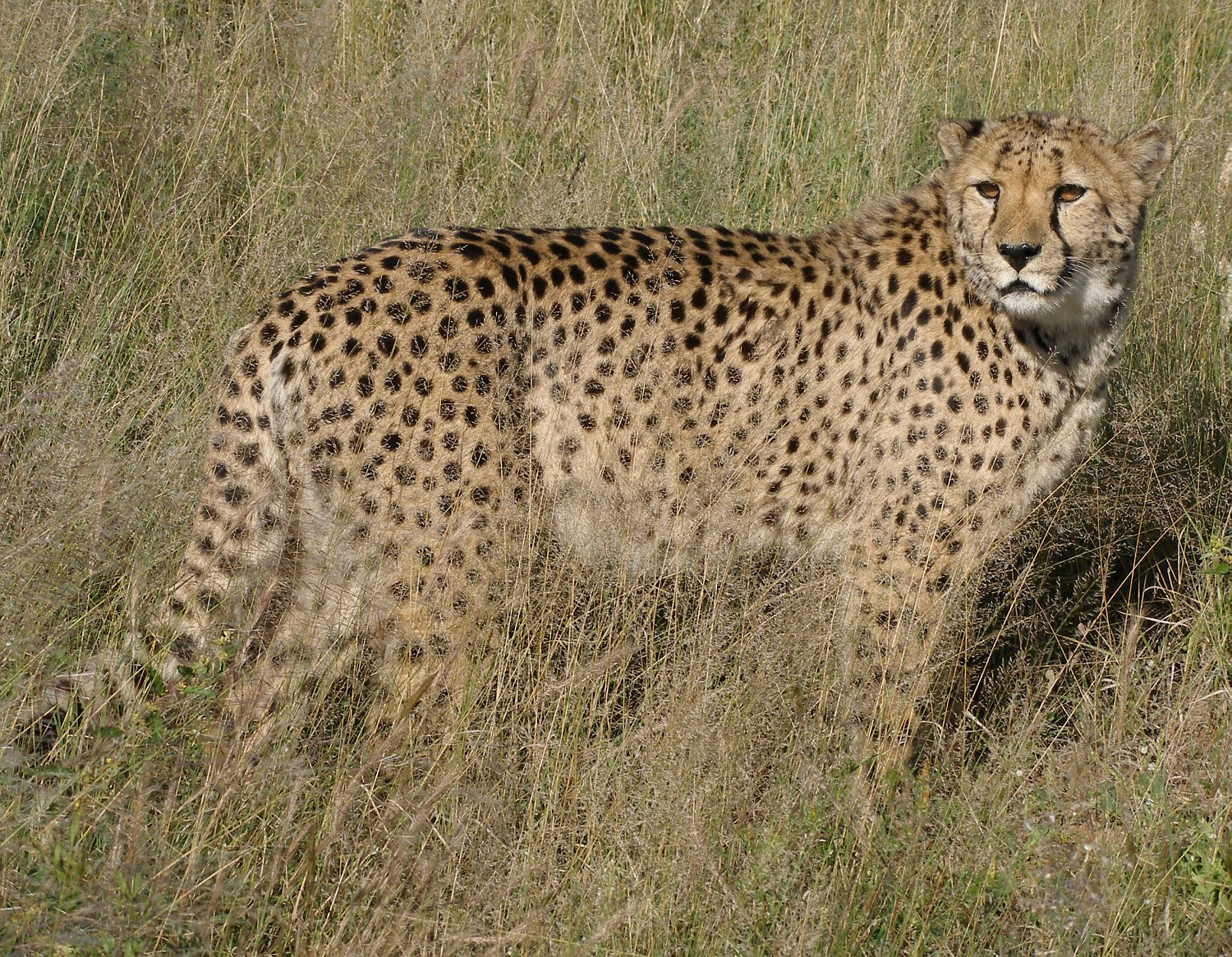
Cheetah

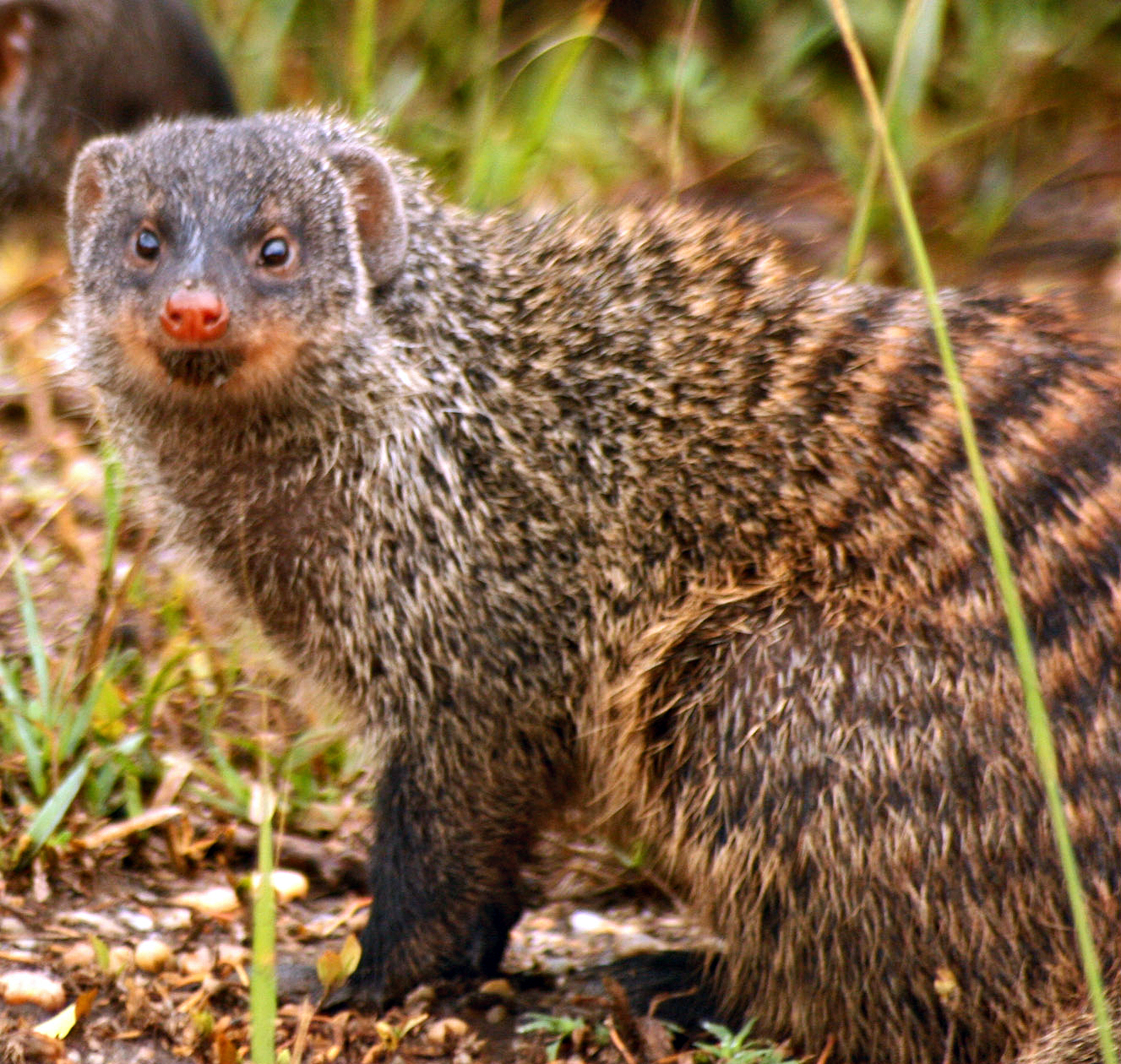
Banded mongoose

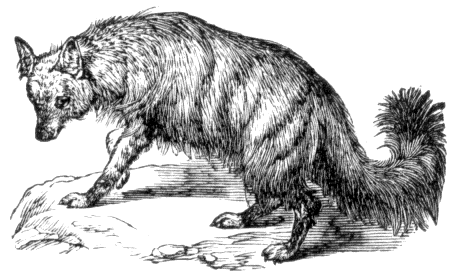
Aardwolf

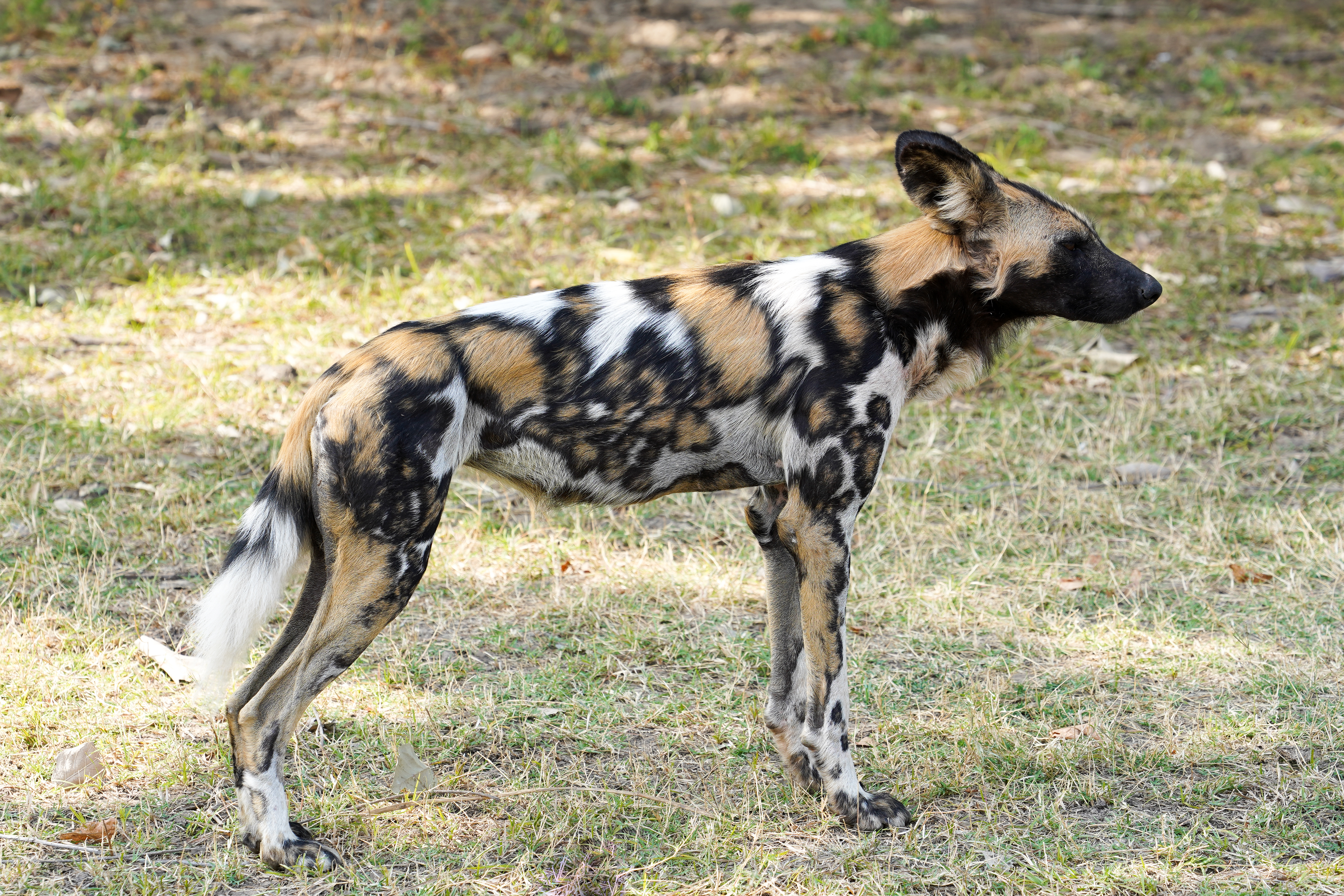
African wild dog

There are over 260 species of carnivorans, the majority of which feed primarily on meat. They have a characteristic skull shape and dentition.

- Suborder: Feliformia
  - Family: Felidae (cats)
    - Subfamily: Felinae
      - Genus: Acinonyx
        - Cheetah, Acinonyx jubatus VU
          - Southeast African cheetah, A.j. jubatus CR
      - Genus: Caracal
        - Caracal, Caracal caracal LC
      - Genus: Felis
        - African wildcat, F. lybica LC, possibly resident
      - Genus: Leptailurus
        - Serval, Leptailurus serval LC
    - Subfamily: Pantherinae
      - Genus: Panthera
        - Lion, Panthera leo VU
          - Panthera leo melanochaita
        - Leopard, Panthera pardus VU
          - African leopard, P.p. pardus
  - Family: Viverridae
    - Subfamily: Viverrinae
      - Genus: Civettictis
        - African civet, C. civetta LC
      - Genus: Genetta
        - Angolan genet, Genetta angolensis LC
        - Common genet, Genetta genetta LC
        - Rusty-spotted genet, Genetta maculata LC
  - Family: Nandiniidae
    - Genus: Nandinia
      - African palm civet, Nandinia binotata LC
  - Family: Herpestidae (mongooses)
    - Genus: Atilax
      - Marsh mongoose, Atilax paludinosus LC
    - Genus: Bdeogale
      - Bushy-tailed mongoose, B. crassicauda LC
    - Genus: Helogale
      - Common dwarf mongoose, Helogale parvula LC
    - Genus: Herpestes
      - Egyptian mongoose, Herpestes ichneumon LC
      - Common slender mongoose, Herpestes sanguineus LC
    - Genus: Ichneumia
      - White-tailed mongoose, I. albicauda LC
    - Genus: Mungos
      - Banded mongoose, Mungos mungo LC
    - Genus: Paracynictis
      - Selous' mongoose, Paracynictis selousi LC
    - Genus: Rhynchogale
      - Meller's mongoose, Rhynchogale melleri LC
  - Family: Hyaenidae (hyaenas)
    - Genus: Crocuta
      - Spotted hyena, Crocuta crocuta LC
    - Genus: Proteles
      - Aardwolf, Proteles cristatus LC
- Suborder: Caniformia
  - Family: Canidae (dogs, foxes)
    - Genus: Lupulella
      - Side-striped jackal, L. adusta LC
    - Genus: Lycaon
      - African wild dog, L. pictus EN
  - Family: Mustelidae (mustelids)
    - Genus: Ictonyx
      - Striped polecat, I. striatus LC
    - Genus: Poecilogale
      - African striped weasel, P. albinucha LC
    - Genus: Mellivora
      - Honey badger, M. capensis LC
    - Genus: Lutra
      - Speckle-throated otter, L. maculicollis LC
    - Genus: Aonyx
      - African clawless otter, A. capensis LC

== Order: Perissodactyla (odd-toed ungulates) ==
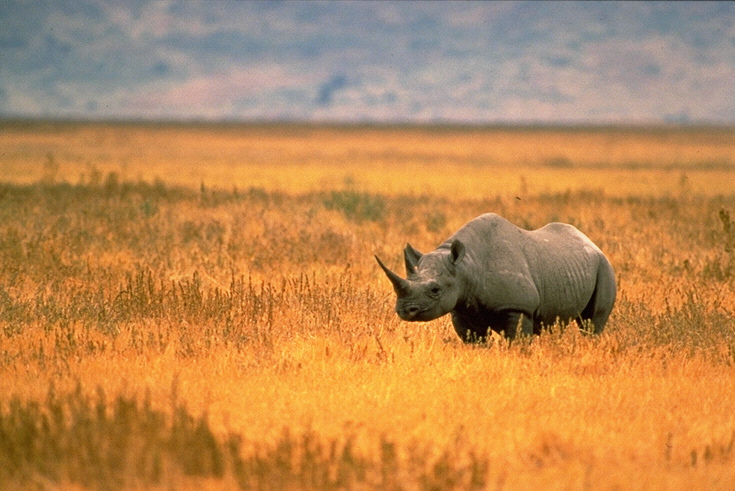
Black rhinoceros

The odd-toed ungulates are browsing and grazing mammals. They are usually large to very large, and have relatively simple stomachs and a large middle toe.

- Family: Equidae (horses etc.)
  - Genus: Equus
    - Grant's zebra, Equus quagga boehmi LC
    - Crawshay's zebra, Equus quagga crawshayi LC
- Family: Rhinocerotidae
  - Genus: Diceros
    - South-central black rhinoceros, Diceros bicornis minor CR
  - Genus: Ceratotherium
    - Southern white rhinoceros, Ceratotherium simum simum NT

== Order: Artiodactyla (even-toed ungulates) ==
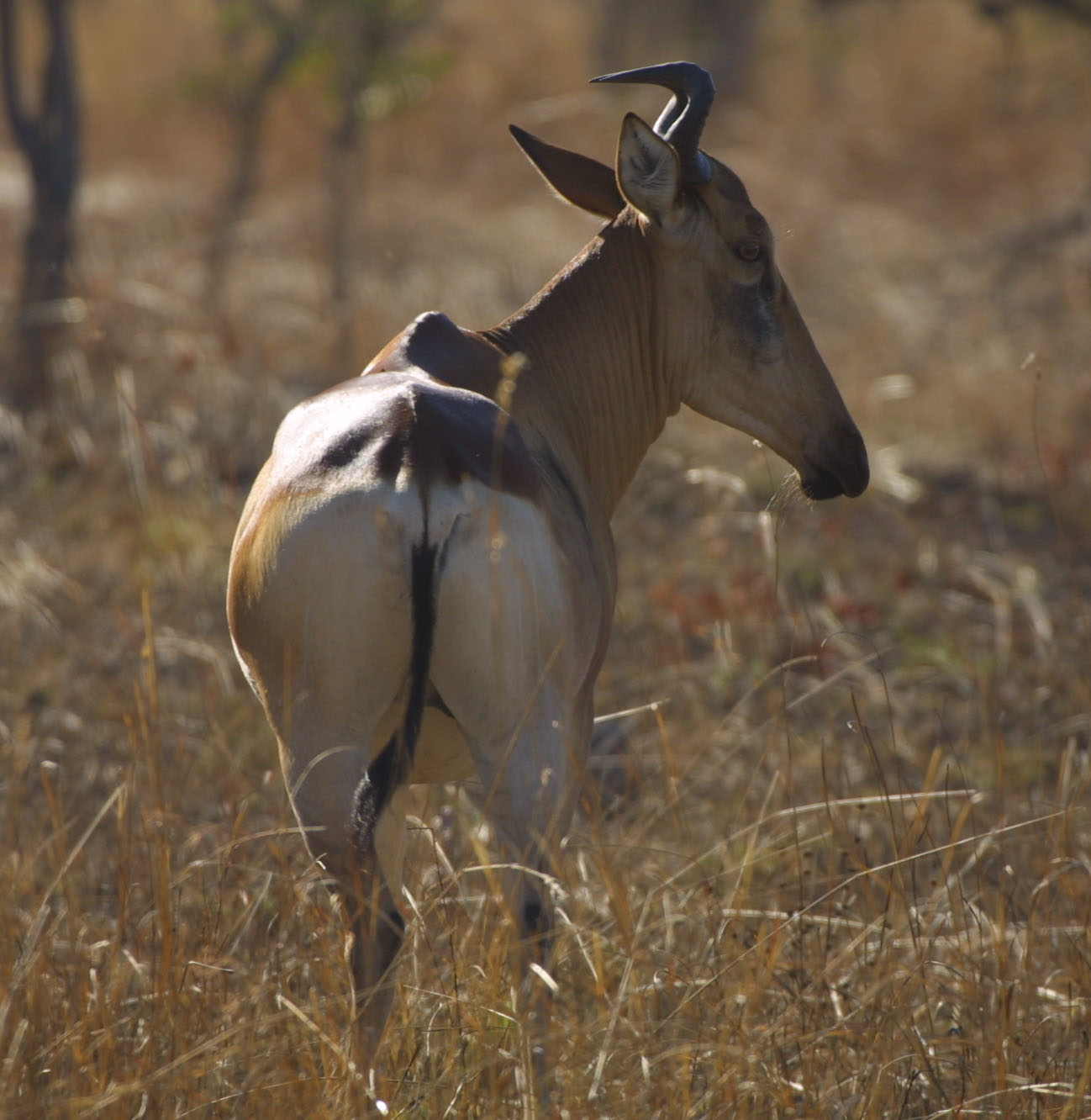
Lichtenstein's hartebeest

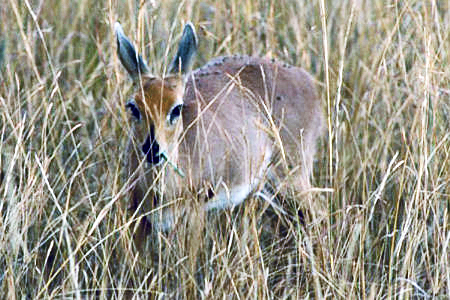
Oribi

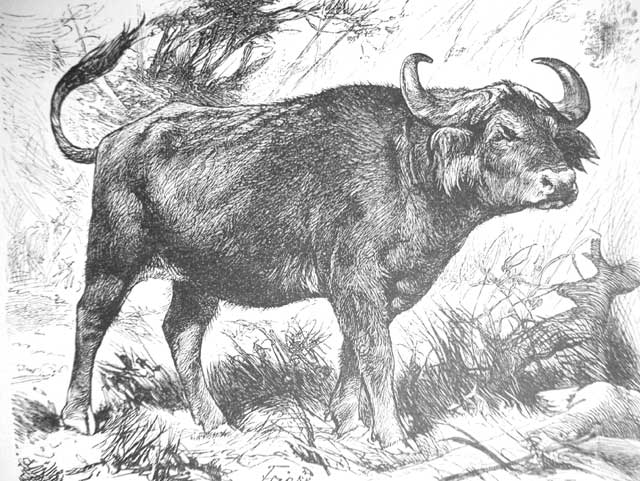
African buffalo

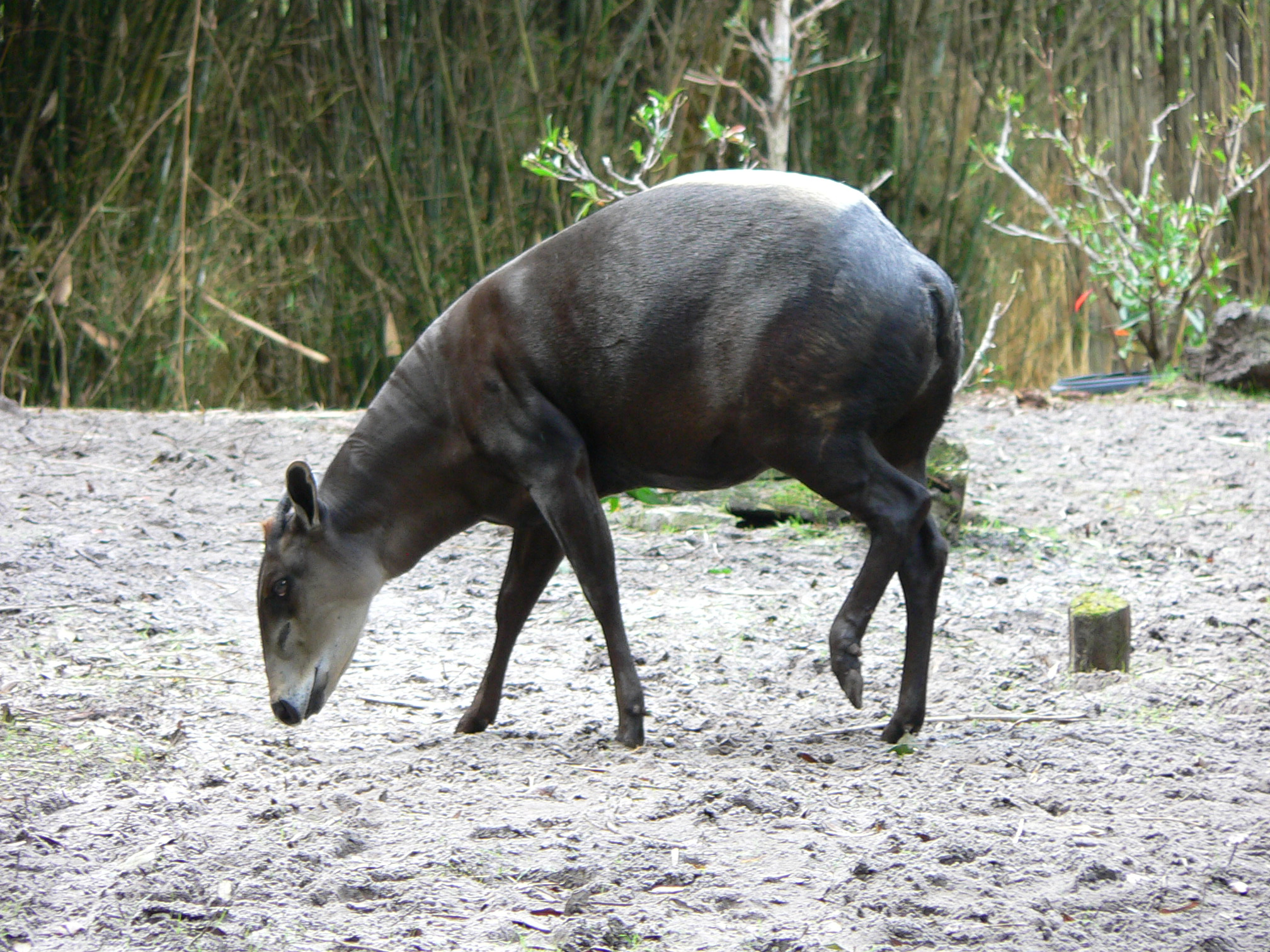
Yellow-backed duiker

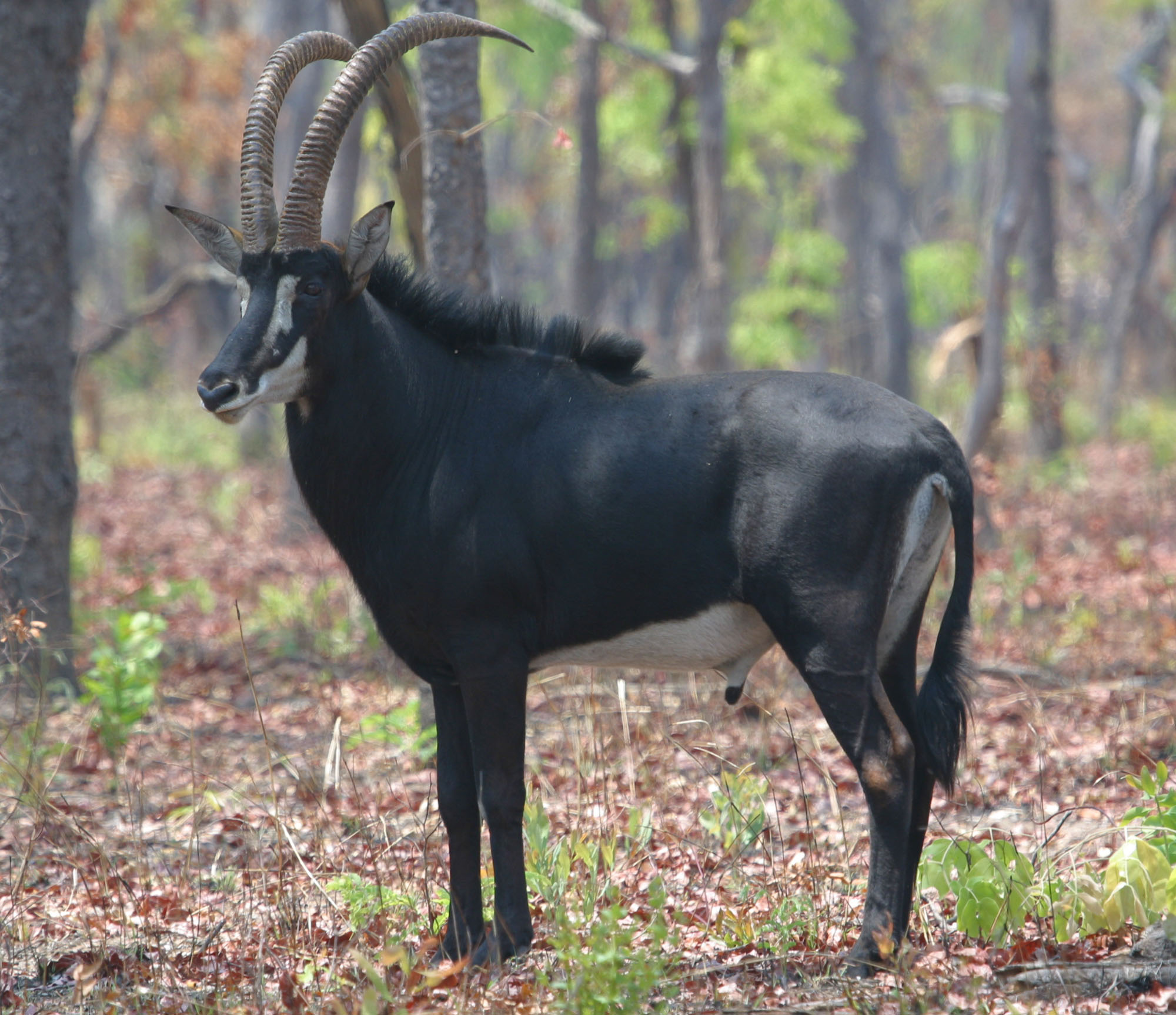
Sable antelope

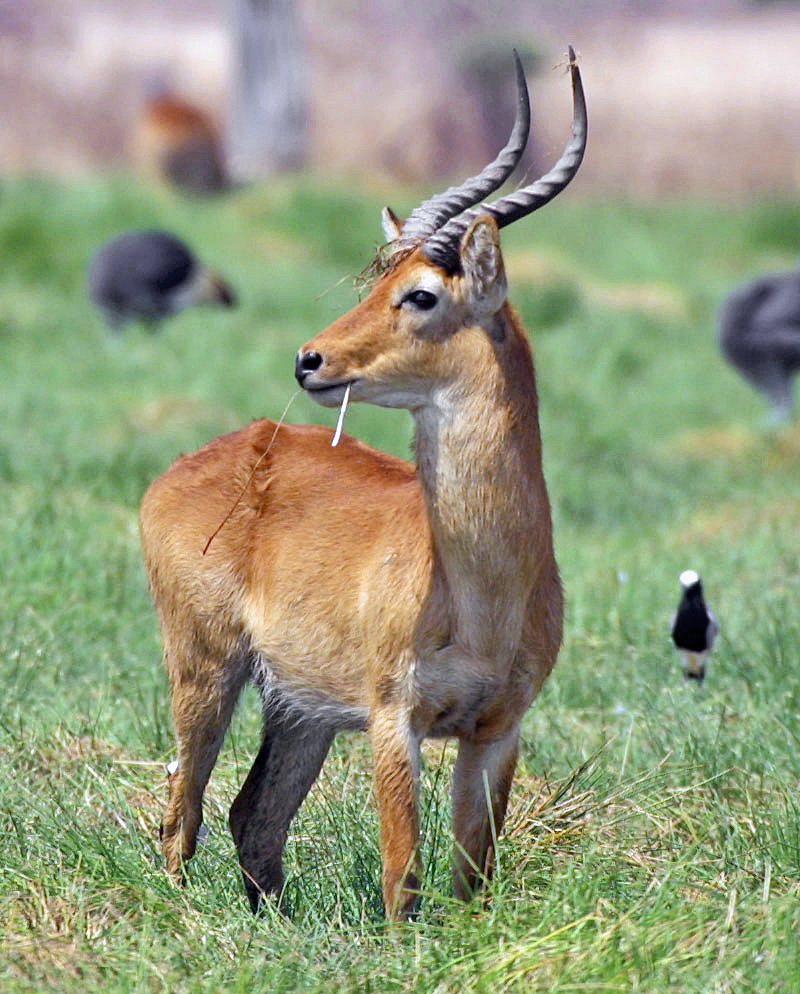
Puku

The even-toed ungulates are ungulates whose weight is borne about equally by the third and fourth toes, rather than mostly or entirely by the third as in perissodactyls. There are about 220 artiodactyl species, including many that are of great economic importance to humans.

- Family: Suidae (pigs)
  - Subfamily: Phacochoerinae
    - Genus: Phacochoerus
      - Common warthog, Phacochoerus africanus LR/lc
  - Subfamily: Suinae
    - Genus: Potamochoerus
      - Bushpig, Potamochoerus larvatus LR/lc
- Family: Hippopotamidae (hippopotamuses)
  - Genus: Hippopotamus
    - Hippopotamus, Hippopotamus amphibius VU
- Family: Giraffidae (giraffe, okapi)
  - Genus: Giraffa
    - South African giraffe, Giraffa giraffa giraffa VU
    - Masai giraffe, Giraffa tippelskirchi VU
    - Rhodesian giraffe, Giraffa camelopardalis thornicrofti VU
- Family: Bovidae (cattle, antelope, sheep, goats)
  - Subfamily: Alcelaphinae
    - Genus: Alcelaphus
      - Lichtenstein's hartebeest, Alcelaphus lichtensteinii LR/cd
    - Genus: Connochaetes
      - Blue wildebeest, Connochaetes taurinus LR/cd
    - Genus: Damaliscus
      - Topi, Damaliscus lunatus LR/cd
  - Subfamily: Antilopinae
    - Genus: Oreotragus
      - Klipspringer, Oreotragus oreotragus LR/cd
    - Genus: Ourebia
      - Oribi, Ourebia ourebi LR/cd
    - Genus: Raphicerus
      - Steenbok, Raphicerus campestris LR/lc
      - Sharpe's grysbok, Raphicerus sharpei LR/cd
  - Subfamily: Bovinae
    - Genus: Syncerus
      - African buffalo, S. caffer NT
    - Genus: Tragelaphus
      - Common eland, Tragelaphus oryx LR/cd
      - Bushbuck, Tragelaphus scriptus LR/lc
      - Sitatunga, Tragelaphus spekii LR/nt
      - Greater kudu, Tragelaphus strepsiceros LR/cd
  - Subfamily: Cephalophinae
    - Genus: Cephalophus
      - Blue duiker, Cephalophus monticola LR/lc
      - Red forest duiker, Cephalophus natalensis LR/cd
      - Yellow-backed duiker, Cephalophus silvicultor LR/nt
    - Genus: Sylvicapra
      - Common duiker, Sylvicapra grimmia LR/lc
  - Subfamily: Hippotraginae
    - Genus: Hippotragus
      - Roan antelope, Hippotragus equinus LR/cd
      - Sable antelope, Hippotragus niger LR/cd
  - Subfamily: Aepycerotinae
    - Genus: Aepyceros
      - Impala, Aepyceros melampus LR/cd
  - Subfamily: Reduncinae
    - Genus: Kobus
      - Waterbuck, Kobus ellipsiprymnus LR/cd
      - Lechwe, Kobus leche LR/cd
      - Puku, Kobus vardonii LR/cd
    - Genus: Redunca
      - Southern reedbuck, Redunca arundinum LR/cd

== See also ==
- List of chordate orders
- Lists of mammals by region
- Mammal classification
- List of mammals described in the 2000s
