= Moringa community =

Moringa Community is a charity based in Ghana which is dedicated to improving quality of life through sustainable and locally appropriate technologies. Current work is centered on the village of Baako, where skills in woodworking and food preservation are taught in a purpose-built schoolroom.

== History ==
In March 2007, Abubakar "Abu" Abdulai contacted Jeffry Lohr from an Internet Cafe in Cape Coast, a city in Ghana, West Africa, hoping to study at Jeffry's Lohr woodworking school in Pennsylvania so that he could gain skills that would help him develop his country. After a long struggle to gain a visa, Abu arrived in the US in April 2008, with the help of generous donors who contributed to Jeffry's fund to finance Abu's travel.

After learning about the realities of Ghana from Abu, Jeffry and his wife Linda realized that in order to help his country, Abu did not need Western technology, but rather needed equipment that was affordable and practical in his country. As a result, Linda developed Moringa's Food Preservation Project, which will train Ghanaians in practical, affordable food preservation canning techniques so that they could have stores of food for the harsh rainy season. Jeffry conceived the idea to engineer woodworking equipment that will innovatively transform readily obtainable hand held power tools into efficient, Western production equipment.

Abu left the United States in July 2008, and upon his return to Ghana, he elicited the support of the visionary Chief of the village Baako, named Nana Kweku Adu-Twum. Nana Kweku generously granted Abu nine acres of land, near public electricity, where Abu is now constructing the Moringa Community Center, where a fully fledged trade school will be started that will benefit the entire community. Over time, the aim is to expand the operation by incorporating other life and occupational skills, and by broadening the geographical impact to other regions in Ghana and West Africa.

== Current projects ==
Current projects include:

- Canning & Food Preservation Project
- Third World Woodworking Project
- Moringa oleifera
- Grass Cutter Farming
- Moringa Kente & Fabric Arts
- Moringa's Artesian Water System

== Future projects ==
- Cybercafe

== Funding ==
The charity is run on an entirely voluntary basis with small investments from private sources. Their pledge to supporters is that 94% of every Dollar of funds donated goes in full to the project in Ghana.
