= Lesser cane rat =

Conservation status
- Least Concern (IUCN 3.1)

Scientific classification
- Kingdom: Animalia
- Phylum: Chordata
- Class: Mammalia
- Order: Rodentia
- Family: Thryonomyidae
- Genus: Thryonomys
- Species: T. gregorianus

Binomial name
- Thryonomys gregorianus (Thomas, 1894)
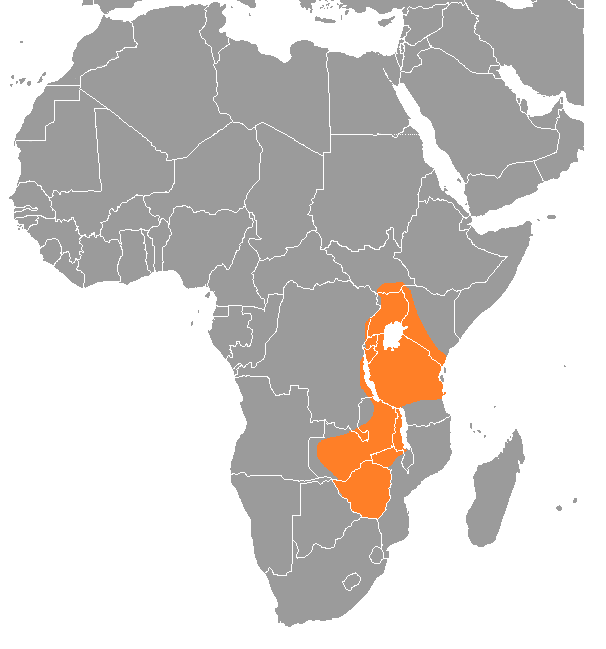

Species of rodent

The lesser cane rat (Thryonomys gregorianus) is a species of rodent in the family Thryonomyidae. It is found in Cameroon, Chad, Democratic Republic of the Congo, Ethiopia, Kenya, Malawi, South Sudan, Tanzania, Uganda, Zambia, Zimbabwe, and possibly Mozambique. Its natural habitats are subtropical or tropical dry shrubland, subtropical or tropical dry lowland grassland, and shrub-dominated wetlands.

== Description ==
The lesser cane rat grows to a length of about 38 centimetres (15 in), about one quarter of which is the tail. Males are usually larger than females. The average weight of the lesser cane rat is 1.4 to 2.4 kg (3.1 to 5.3 lb) in males and 1.8 to 1.9 kg (4.0 to 4.2 lb) in females and they are a little less than half the size of the greater cane rat. However, some males are as large as 3.5 to 5 kg (7.7 to 11.0 lb) about the size of an average greater cane rat. The hair is coarse and rather bristle-like and lies flat against the body. The ears are small and almost hidden in the fur. The feet are long with three functioning toes, bare palms and strong claws. The back and sides of the animal are yellowish- or greyish-brown and the underparts greyish-white. The tail has a few bristles and scales and is brown above and white below.

Its karyotype has 2n = 40 and FN = 80.

== Distribution and habitat ==
The lesser cane rat is native to Central and East Africa and the more northerly parts of southern Africa. The main parts of its range are southern Sudan, the whole of Uganda, western Kenya, Tanzania, Zambia, Malawi and Zimbabwe but it also occurs sporadically in some of the neighbouring countries. It is found in open grassy countryside, the fringes of marshland and in woodland and it has been recorded at an altitude of 2,600 metres (8,500 ft) above sea level in the Rwenzori Mountains. It occupies much the same range as the greater cane rat (Thryonomys swinderianus) but that species is more aquatic and frequents river banks and lakesides.

== Behaviour ==
The lesser cane rat is nocturnal and mainly moves around alone though it may live in a small family group. Though its eyesight is poor, it has a keen sense of hearing and individuals communicate with each other using grunts and whistles, and they may stamp their feet to warn others of danger. It is herbivorous and feeds on grasses, seeds, grain, fruit and other plant material. An important food item is often elephant grass (Pennisetum purpureum) but this rat is opportunistic and will also feed on crops such as peanut, maize, sweet potato, cassava and pumpkin.

The breeding season is in the rainy season and there may be two litters in the year. The gestation period is about three months and the litter size is typically two or three young. These are precocial and are able to move around shortly after birth. They hide in nests in the grass where the female visits them at intervals to allow them to suckle. They become sexually mature at about a year and probably live three years.

== Status ==
The lesser cane rat is assessed as being of "Least Concern" by the IUCN in its Red List of Threatened Species. Although the precise range of the lesser cane rat and its population trend are not known, it is a fairly common species and faces no specific threats. It is eaten as bushmeat in some parts of its range.
