= Lachaise's climbing mouse =

Conservation status
- Vulnerable (IUCN 3.1)

Scientific classification
- Kingdom: Animalia
- Phylum: Chordata
- Class: Mammalia
- Order: Rodentia
- Family: Nesomyidae
- Genus: Dendromus
- Species: D. lachaisei

Binomial name
- Dendromus lachaisei Denys & Aniskine, 2012

Species of rodent

Lachaise's climbing mouse (Dendromus lachaisei) is a species of climbing mouse described by Denys and Aniskine in 2012. First discovered on the slopes of Mount Nimba, it is now believed that the species is extant within Guinea, Liberia and Cote d’Ivoire.

== Description ==
Lachaise's climbing mouse measures between 5.5 and 7.7 cm (2.2 and 3.0 in) in body length, with a tail length of between 7.9 and 9.8 cm (3.1 and 3.9 in). The upper section of the body is light brown, while the chest and stomach are whitish in colour. The species are distinguished from close relatives through the absence of a black stripe on the back, a lack of white spot on the muzzle, the presence of an additional toe, and cranial differences.

== Distribution and habitat ==
Specimens caught to date have been located within the boundaries of the Mount Nimba Strict Nature Reserve, which overlaps the borders of Guinea, Liberia and Cote d’Ivoire. The mouse tends to frequent montane savannah plains, lowland and montane tropical forest and cultivated banana and quinine plantations.

== Threats ==
The species may be under direct threat from mining activity and human movement. Due to the location in regard to the border of Guinea, Liberia and Cote d’Ivoire, the locality is prone to extensive refugee movement. The area is additionally mined on the basis of iron ore concessions, posing a threat to the habitat of the mouse. These prevalent risks have relatively recently seen the area added to the List of World Heritage in Danger. The former countries place protections upon the reserve, but the status of conservation regarding Cote d’Ivoire remains unknown.
