= Montane African climbing mouse =

Conservation status
- Least Concern (IUCN 3.1)

Scientific classification
- Kingdom: Animalia
- Phylum: Chordata
- Class: Mammalia
- Infraclass: Placentalia
- Order: Rodentia
- Family: Nesomyidae
- Genus: Dendromus
- Species: D. insignis

Binomial name
- Dendromus insignis (Thomas, 1903)

Synonyms
- Dendromys insignis Thomas, 1903; Dendromus mesomelas percivali Heller, 1912

Species of rodent

The montane African climbing mouse or remarkable climbing mouse (Dendromus insignis) is a species of rodent in the family Nesomyidae. It is found in Democratic Republic of the Congo, Kenya, Rwanda, Tanzania, and Uganda.

== Description ==
The montane African climbing mice have short, soft brown to reddish-brown pelage with a dark stripe down the middle of their backs and dark gray or grayish underparts. They have tails that can equal up to 133% of their head and body length, which taper and are covered in scales and short hair.

Montane African climbing mice have a typical mymorphous zygomatic arch with a narrow infraorbital foramen, due to the prominence of the lower anterior-positioned masseter muscles—resulting in only three molars in a row and grooved upper incisors.

The hind limbs of the montane African climbing mouse are elongated, with hind feet highly specialized for climbing. D. insignis have a reduced inner proximal foot pad, and a reduced first digit with a nail.

The montane African climbing mouse is one of the largest species of the genus Dendromus, with head and body length ranges from 76 mm to 90 mm and weigh from 7-20 g, up to 20% larger than other Dendromus species. Additionally, their head is relatively large compared to other genera of rodents, making up about 27% of their head and body length and resulting in longer molar rows.

== Ecology ==
=== Behavior and Diet ===
The montane African climbing mouse avoids predation by being nocturnal, using its well-adapted hind feet to climb twigs and dense grasses and its long hindlimbs to produce long jumps of up to 45 cm. Its climbing agility is used to contribute to its insectivorous and granivorous diet, and allows for nests to be above ground.

=== Range and Habitat ===
Its home range of extends through mountainous areas but they generally dwell in heath and alpine zones. They have been documented across a wide range of high altitude locales, including elevations as high as 4240 m. Below 2000 m, grassland meets the montane forest, and D. insignis is less commonly found, as easy-to-climb dense vegetation is reduced.
