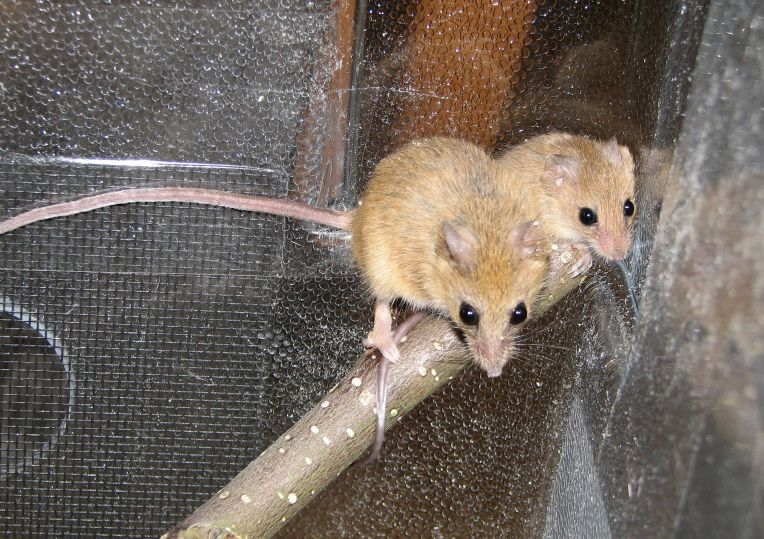
- Chestnut climbing mouse, (Dendromus mystacalis)

Scientific classification
- Kingdom: Animalia
- Phylum: Chordata
- Class: Mammalia
- Infraclass: Placentalia
- Order: Rodentia
- Family: Nesomyidae
- Subfamily: Dendromurinae
- Genus: Dendromus; A. Smith, 1829

Synonyms
- Chortomys Thomas, 1916; Poemys Thomas, 1916; Dendromys Smuts, 1832; Dendromys J. B. Fischer, 1830

= Dendromus =

Climbing mice Temporal range: Late Miocene - Recent

Genus of rodents

Mice in the genus Dendromus are commonly referred to as African climbing mice or tree mice, although these terms are often used to describe all members of the subfamily Dendromurinae. The genus is currently restricted to sub-Saharan Africa, but fossils classified in the genus have been found from Late Miocene deposits in Arabia and Europe.

== Characteristics ==
Mice in the genus Dendromus are small (Head and body: 5–10 cm) with relatively long tails (6–13 cm). This tail is semi-prehensile and provides an aid in climbing. The dense fur is grey or brown and either one or two stripes are present on the back. Unlike most other muroids, these mice have only three fingers on each hand. They are also distinguished by their grooved incisors.

== Natural history ==
Habitat varies widely. Elevation ranges from sea-level to 4,300 m (14,100 ft). Anecdotal evidence suggests they are arboreal, but data supporting this hypothesis are limited. They do appear to be good climbers and the degree to which they spend time in trees seems to vary by species.

== Species ==
The following species are assigned to this genus:

- Dendromus insignis (Thomas, 1903)
- Dendromus kahuziensis Dieterlen, 1969
- Dendromus lachaisei Denys & Aniskine, 2012
- Dendromus leucostomus Monard, 1933
- Dendromus lovati (de Winton, 1900)
- Dendromus melanotis (A. Smith, 1834)
- Dendromus mesomelas (Brants, 1827)
- Dendromus messorius (Thomas, 1903)
- Dendromus mystacalis (Heuglin, 1863)
- Dendromus nyasae Thomas, 1916
- Dendromus nyikae Wroughton, 1909
- Dendromus oreas Osgood, 1936
- Dendromus ruppi Dieterlen, 2009
- Dendromus vernayi Hill & Carter, 1937
