= Banana climbing mouse =

Conservation status
- Least Concern (IUCN 3.1)

Scientific classification
- Domain: Eukaryota
- Kingdom: Animalia
- Phylum: Chordata
- Class: Mammalia
- Order: Rodentia
- Family: Nesomyidae
- Genus: Dendromus
- Species: D. messorius

Binomial name
- Dendromus messorius (Thomas, 1903)

Species of rodent

The banana climbing mouse (Dendromus messorius) is a species of rodent in the family Nesomyidae. It is found in Benin, Cameroon, Democratic Republic of the Congo, Nigeria, and Togo. Its natural habitat is subtropical or tropical dry lowland grassland.
