= Vernay's climbing mouse =

Conservation status
- Data Deficient (IUCN 3.1)

Scientific classification
- Kingdom: Animalia
- Phylum: Chordata
- Class: Mammalia
- Order: Rodentia
- Family: Nesomyidae
- Genus: Dendromus
- Species: D. vernayi

Binomial name
- Dendromus vernayi Hill & Carter, 1937

Species of rodent

Vernay's climbing mouse (Dendromus vernayi) is a species of rodent in the family Nesomyidae. It is found only in Angola. Its natural habitat is moist savanna.
