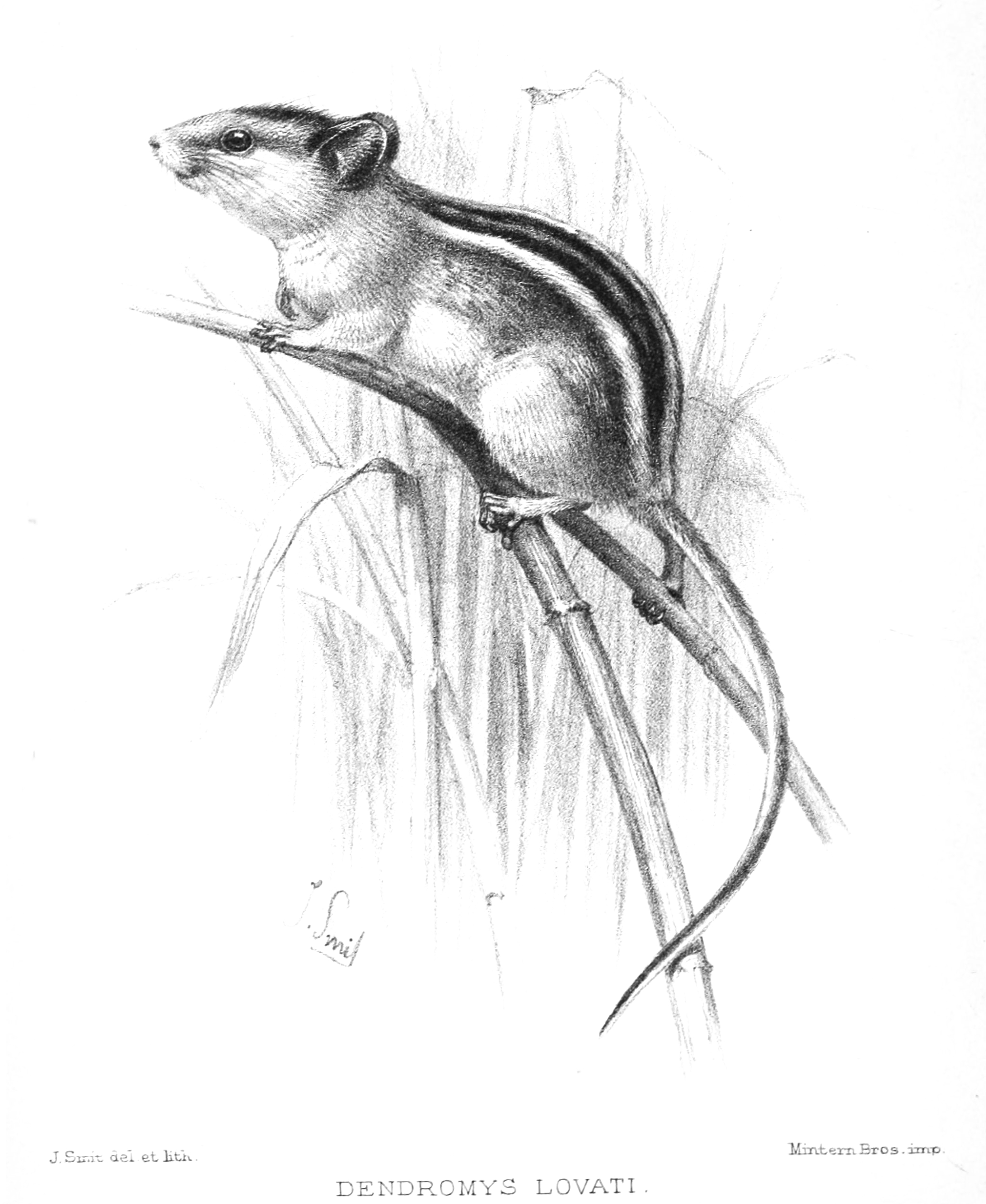

Conservation status
- Least Concern (IUCN 3.1)

Scientific classification
- Kingdom: Animalia
- Phylum: Chordata
- Class: Mammalia
- Order: Rodentia
- Family: Nesomyidae
- Genus: Dendromus
- Species: D. lovati

Binomial name
- Dendromus lovati (de Winton, 1900)

= Lovat's climbing mouse =

Species of rodent

Lovat's climbing mouse (Dendromus lovati) is a species of rodent in the family Nesomyidae. It is found only in Ethiopia. Its natural habitat is subtropical or tropical high-altitude grassland. It is threatened by habitat loss.
