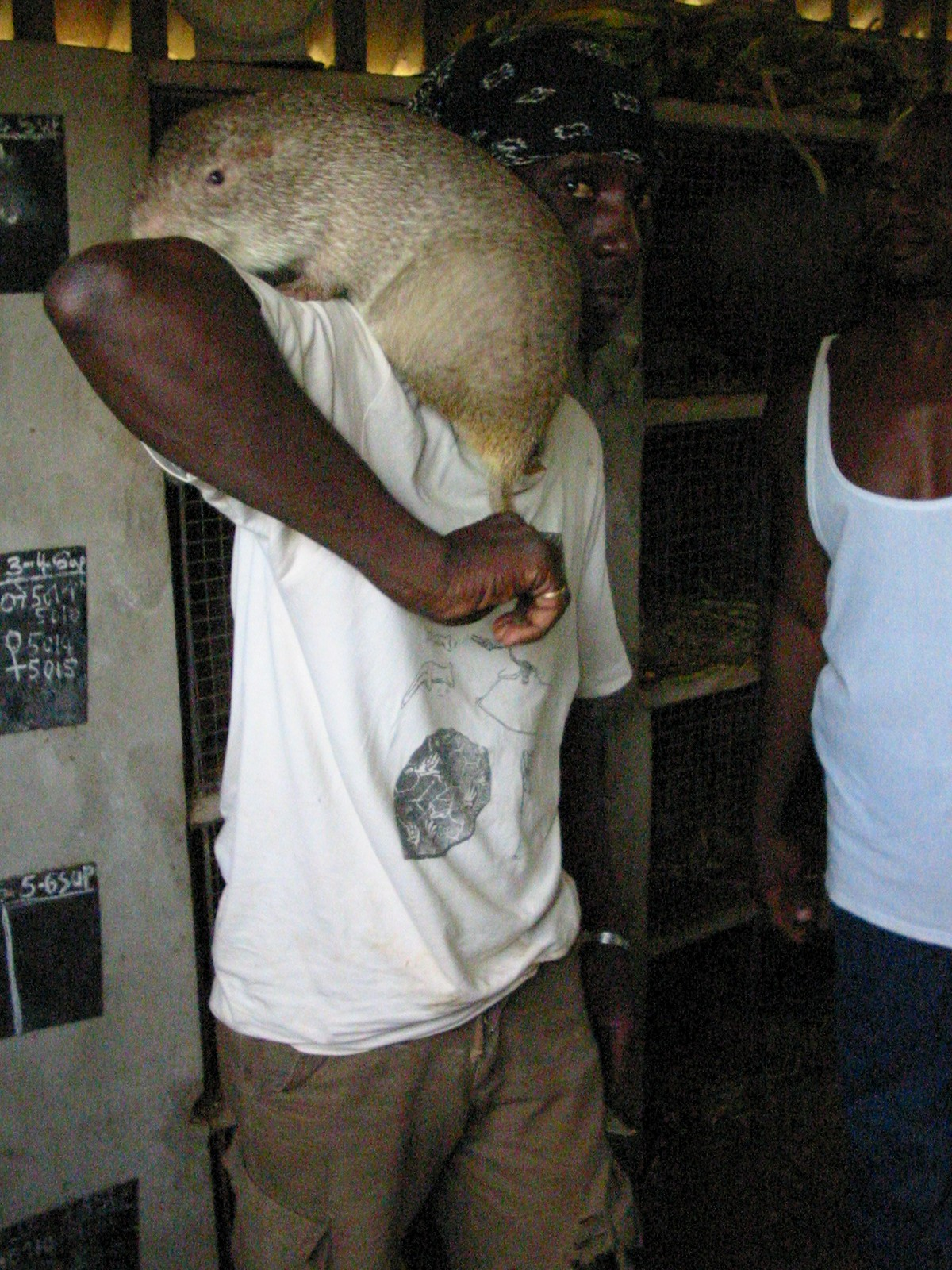
- A man with a greater cane rat (Thryonomys swinderianus)

Scientific classification
- Kingdom: Animalia
- Phylum: Chordata
- Class: Mammalia
- Infraclass: Placentalia
- Order: Rodentia
- Suborder: Hystricomorpha
- Infraorder: Hystricognathi
- Parvorder: Phiomorpha
- Family: Thryonomyidae
- Genus: Thryonomys; Fitzinger, 1867

Type species
- Aulacodus swinderianus Temminck, 1827

Species
- Thryonomys gregorianus (lesser cane rat); Thryonomys swinderianus (greater cane rat)
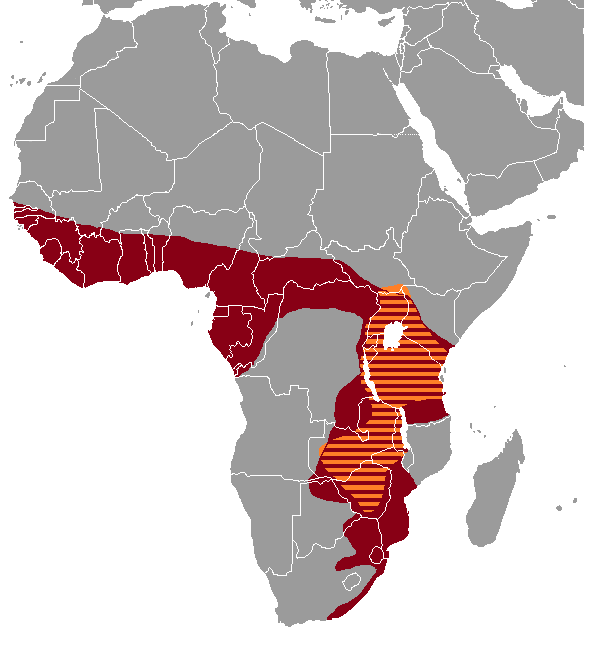
- Reconstructed range of Thryonomys gregorianus (orange) and Thryonomys swinderianus (red), with overlapping ranges in stripe pattern

= Cane rat =

Cane rats Temporal range: Eocene–Recent

Genus of rodents resembling guinea pigs

The genus Thryonomys, also known as cane rats or grasscutters, is a genus of rodent found throughout Sub-Saharan Africa. It is the only extant genus in the family Thryonomyidae. They are eaten in some African countries and are a pest species on many crops. The family name comes from the Greek word thryon, meaning a "rush" or "reed" and mys meaning "mouse".

== Description ==
Cane rats range from 35–60 centimetres (14–24 in) in length. They attain weights of around 3–6 kg (6.6–13.2 lb) and in some cases up to 10 kg (22 lb). They display bristly brown fur speckled with yellow or grey. They live in marshy areas and along river and lake banks, and are herbivores, feeding on aquatic grasses in the wild. In agricultural areas, they feed on sugarcane in plantations, making them a significant crop pest.

Females bear litters of 2–4 young 1+ times/year. Cane rats are sexually mature and able to reproduce at 6 months of age.

== Relationship with humans ==
Cane rats are widely distributed and farmers expend substantial energy fencing the rodents out of their fields. They are valued as a source of "bushmeat" in Western Africa and Central Africa. Like the guinea pig, their meat offers a higher protein but lower fat content than conventional livestock; it is appreciated for its tenderness and taste.

Savanna dwellers in West Africa traditionally captured wild cane rats and fattened them in captivity. More recently, intensive production of cane rats has emerged in countries such as Benin and Togo. Agricultural extension services in Cameroon, Côte d'Ivoire, Gabon, Ghana, Nigeria, Senegal, and the Democratic Republic of Congo encourage farmers to rear these rodents in rural and peri-urban areas. Research showed how to implement selection and stock improvement. Much of the knowledge and techniques for cane rat breeding came from work carried out at the Benin-Germany breeding station.

Cane rats are not the most prolific rodent species, but the high demand, attractive market price, and the small amount of investment required makes cane rats a feasible mini-livestock activity for income generation in many parts of West and Central Africa.

== Conservation status ==
In some areas they have been over-hunted, and savanna habitat is often at risk during the dry season from bushfires, which are lit during bushmeat hunting expeditions. However, the high exploitation of cane rats in the wild has not had a dangerous effect on their numbers. Some researchers believe that their populations may actually be increasing due to deforestation and changing land use patterns as they have adapted to deforested areas in close proximity to farmlands and people.
