= Rupp's African climbing mouse =

Conservation status
- Data Deficient (IUCN 3.1)

Scientific classification
- Kingdom: Animalia
- Phylum: Chordata
- Class: Mammalia
- Order: Rodentia
- Family: Nesomyidae
- Genus: Dendromus
- Species: D. ruppi

Binomial name
- Dendromus ruppi Dieterlen, 2009

Species of rodent

The Rupp's African climbing mouse (Dendromus ruppi) is a species of rodent in the family Nesomyidae. It is found in South Sudan.
