= Kivu climbing mouse =

Conservation status
- Least Concern (IUCN 3.1)

Scientific classification
- Kingdom: Animalia
- Phylum: Chordata
- Class: Mammalia
- Order: Rodentia
- Family: Nesomyidae
- Genus: Dendromus
- Species: D. nyasae

Binomial name
- Dendromus nyasae Thomas, 1916

Synonyms
- kivu Thomas, 1916

Species of rodent

The Kivu climbing mouse (Dendromus nyasae) is a species of rodent in the family Nesomyidae. It is found in Burundi, Democratic Republic of the Congo, Rwanda, Malawi, Tanzania, Uganda, and Zambia. Its natural habitats are subtropical or tropical moist montane forests, subtropical or tropical high-altitude grassland, swamps, arable land, and plantations .
