= Cameroon climbing mouse =

Conservation status
- Least Concern (IUCN 3.1)

Scientific classification
- Kingdom: Animalia
- Phylum: Chordata
- Class: Mammalia
- Order: Rodentia
- Family: Nesomyidae
- Genus: Dendromus
- Species: D. oreas

Binomial name
- Dendromus oreas Osgood, 1936

Species of rodent

The Cameroon climbing mouse (Dendromus oreas) is a species of rodent in the family Nesomyidae which is endemic to the montane grasslands on three mountains in Cameroon.

== Description ==
The Cameroon climbing mouse is a rather small species of mouse with a long tail and an indistinct black stripe along its back and a long tail. The fur on the dorsum is brown while the ventral fur varies from dark rufous to pale greyish-yellow. There are white or cream patches on the throat and on the chin, and on the anal fur. The ears are blackish with a fine covering of tawny hairs and with a pale spot at the base of each ear on the outer margin. The hindfoot has 5 digits with didit 5 having a claw and being opposable to the other digits.

== Distribution ==
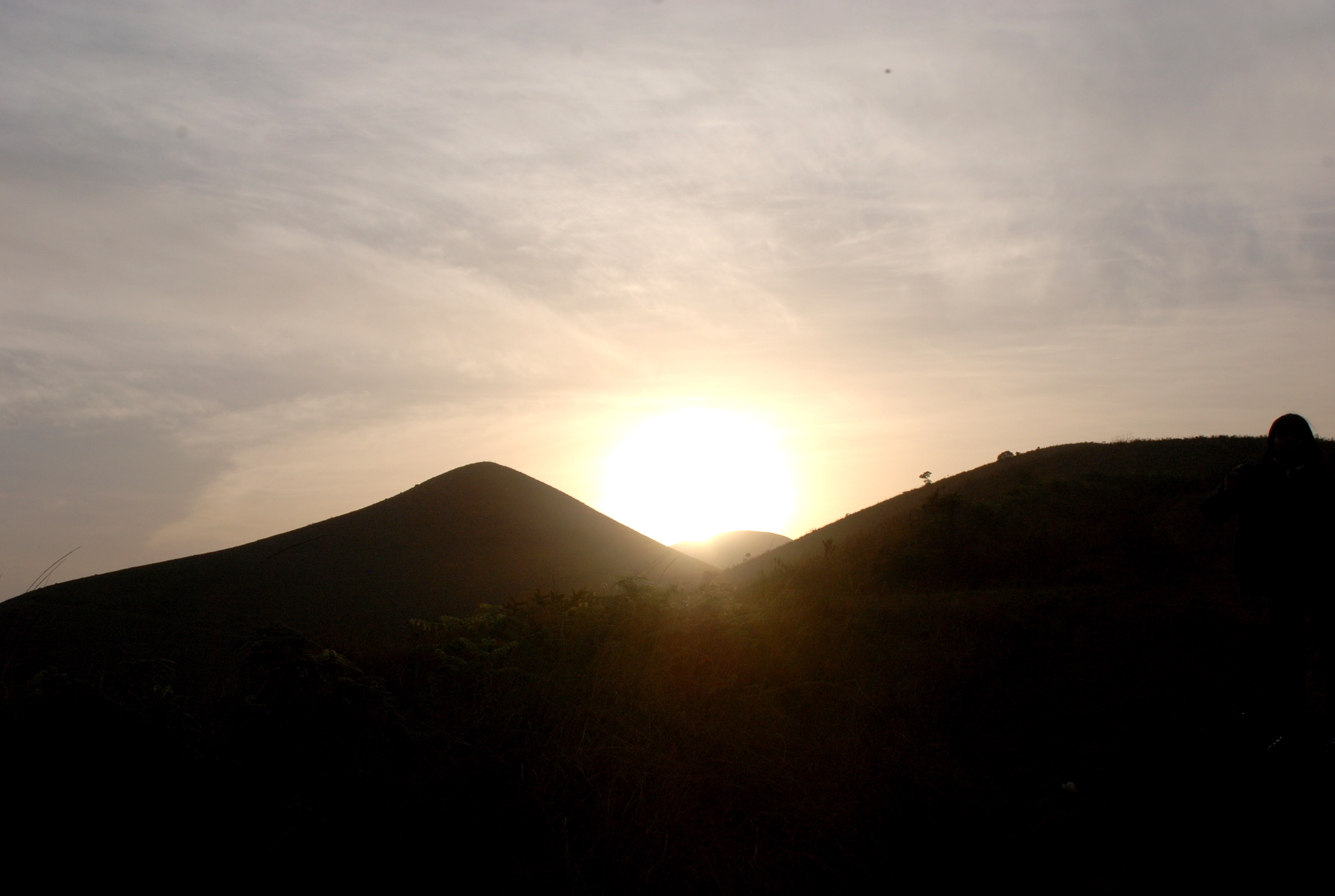
Sunset at Mount Manengouba

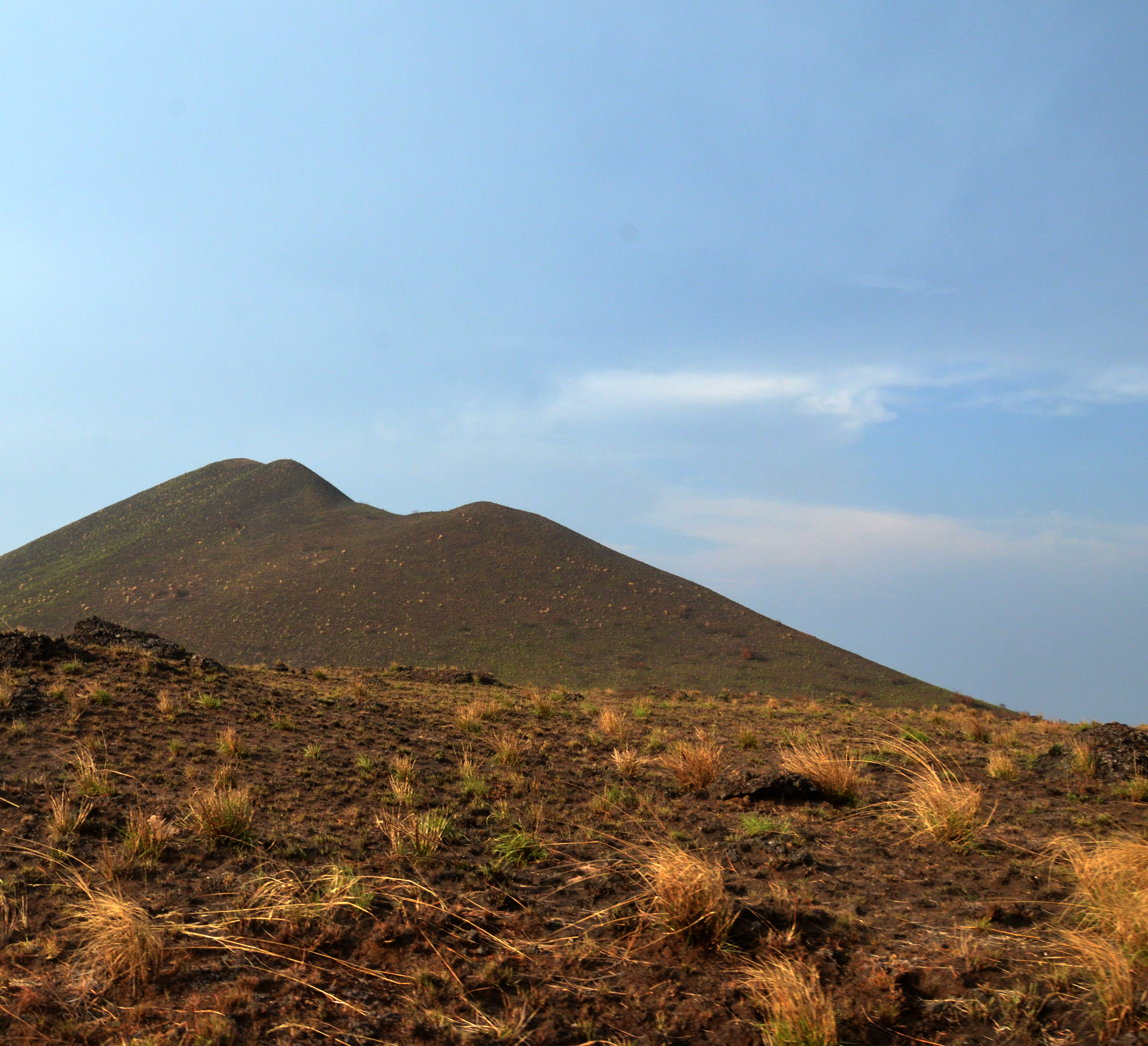
Mount Cameroon

It is found only in Cameroon where it is known from three mountains: Mount Cameroon from 1,700 to 4,000 m above sea level, Mount Manenguba between 1,800 and 1,900 m in altitude and Mount Kupe where it occurs around 850m.

== Habitat ==
Montane savannas above the tree line, among boulders on Mount Cameroon, in grassy scrub on Mount Manenguba and occurring in plantation and farmland on Mount Kupe. It avoids the montane forests at lower altitudes.

== Habits ==
The Cameroon climbing mouse is both diurnal and nocturnal and lives mostly on the ground, digging burrows into the soil despite being well adapted for climbing.

== Threats ==
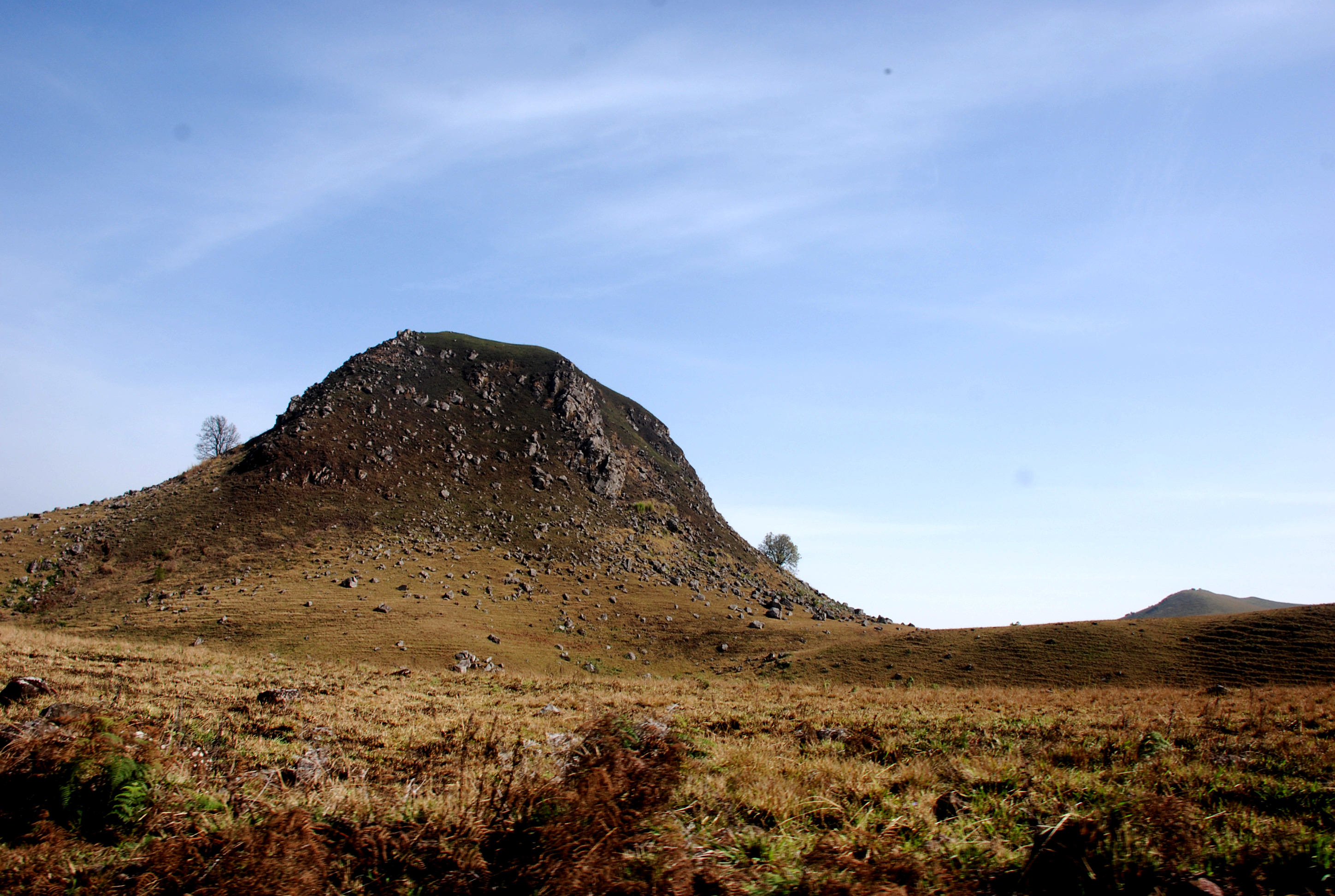
Mount Manengouba

The Cameroon climbing mouse is threatened by climate change which may lead to scrub and tree growth higher up the mountains in its restricted range and as the lower forests are cleared grazing livestock may move up to higher latitudes.
