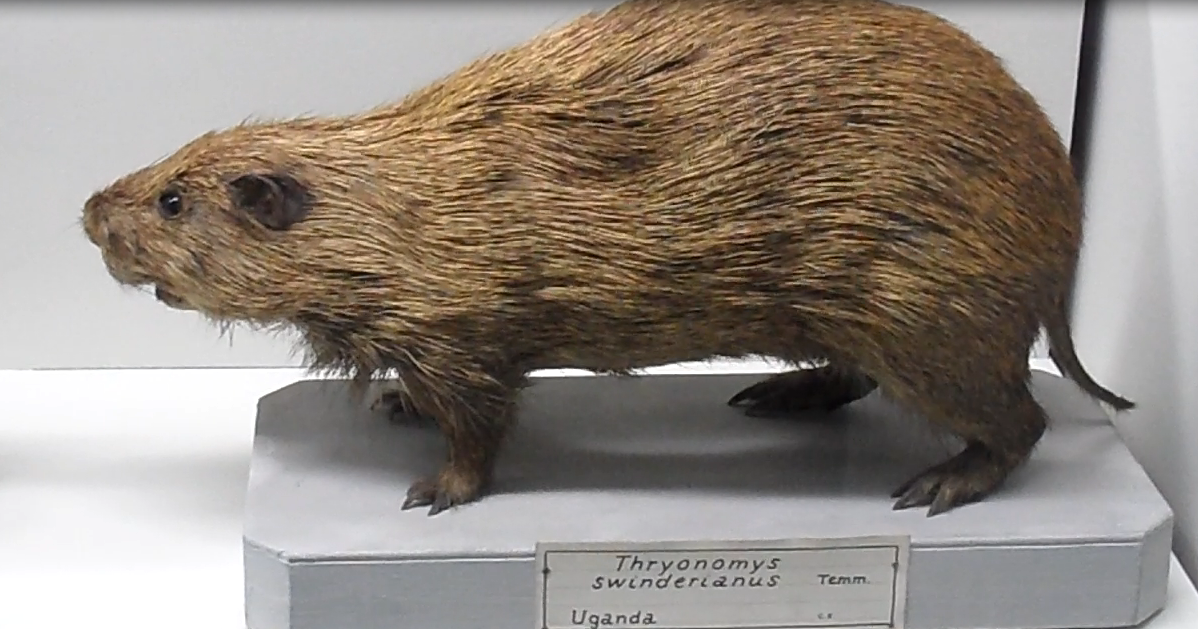
- Greater cane rat (Thryonomys swinderianus)

Scientific classification
- Kingdom: Animalia
- Phylum: Chordata
- Class: Mammalia
- Infraclass: Placentalia
- Order: Rodentia
- Parvorder: Phiomorpha
- Family: Thryonomyidae; Pocock, 1922

Genera
- 1 living and many extinct, see text

= Thryonomyidae =

Thryonomyidae Temporal range: Oligocene - Recent 23.7–0 Ma

Family of rodents

Thryonomyidae is a family of hystricognath rodents that contains the cane rats (Thryonomys) found throughout sub-Saharan Africa, and a number of fossil genera.

== Taxonomy ==
Thryonomyidae was formerly more diverse and widespread, with fossil relatives found in India and Arabia as well. The extinct genus Sacaresia from the island of Mallorca off Spain may also be a member of this family, though its position remains uncertain.

- Genus †Epiphiomys
  - †Epiphiomys coryndoni
- Genus †Gaudeamus
  - †Gaudeamus aegyptius
- Genus †Kochalia
  - †Kochalia geespei
- Genus †Monamys
  - †Monamys simonsi
- Genus †Neosciuromys
  - †Neosciuromys africanus
- Genus †Paraphiomys
  - †Paraphiomys afarensis
  - †Paraphiomys hopwoodi
  - †Paraphiomys knolli
  - †Paraphiomys occidentalis
  - †Paraphiomys orangeus
  - †Paraphiomys pigotti
  - †Paraphiomys renelavocati
  - †Paraphiomys shipmani
- Genus †Paraulacodus
  - †Paraulacodus indicus
  - †Paraulacodus johanesi
- Genus †Protohummus
  - †Protohummus dango
- Genus †Sacaresia?
  - †Sacaresia moyaeponsi
- Genus Thryonomys
  - Thryonomys gregorianus
  - Thryonomys swinderianus
  - †Thryonomys asakomae

Former fossil members of the family include the genus Apodecter and two species of Paraphiomys (australis and roessneri), which have now been transferred to the related Petromuridae.
