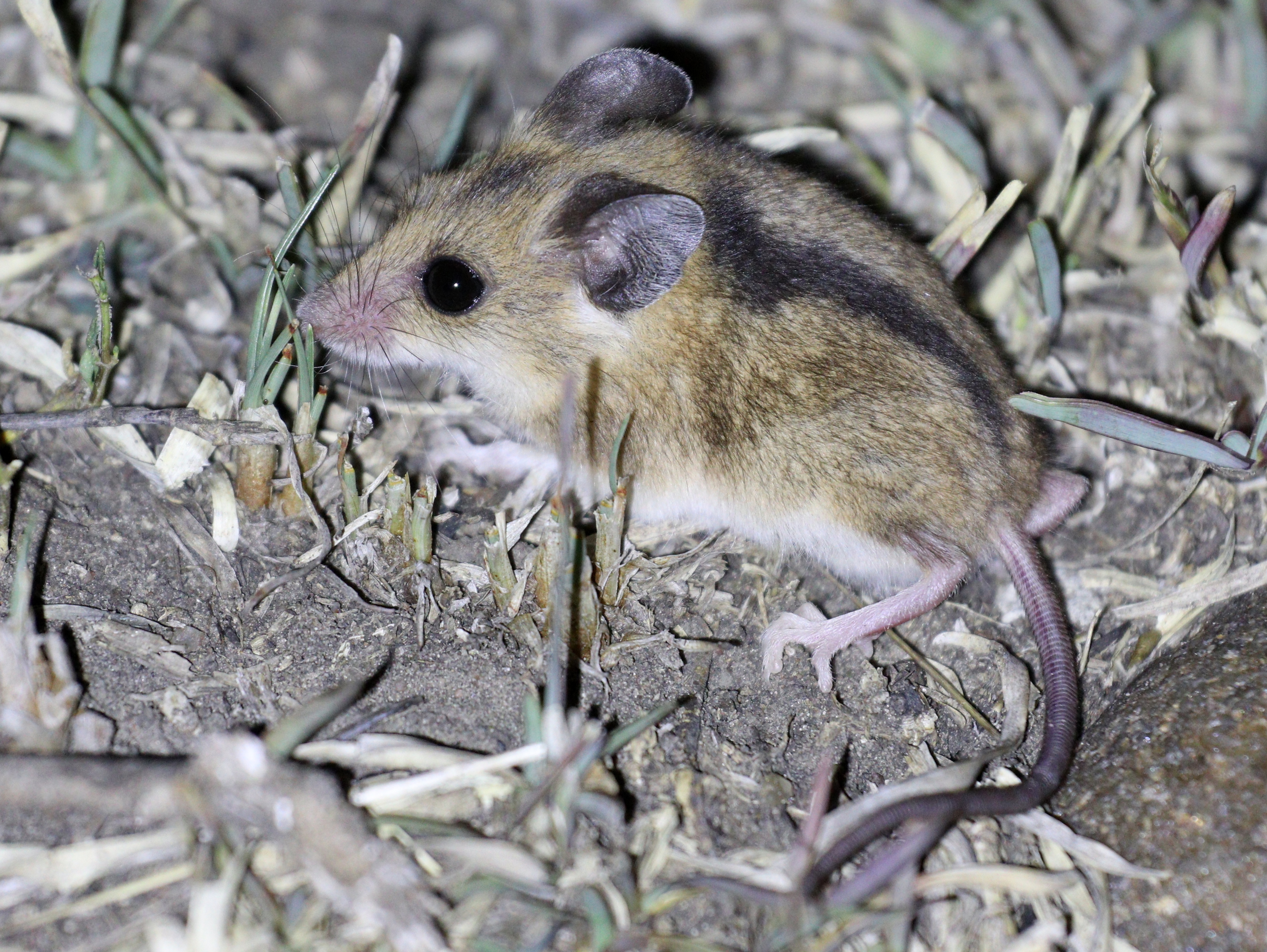

Conservation status
- Least Concern (IUCN 3.1)

Scientific classification
- Kingdom: Animalia
- Phylum: Chordata
- Class: Mammalia
- Order: Rodentia
- Family: Nesomyidae
- Genus: Dendromus
- Species: D. melanotis

Binomial name
- Dendromus melanotis (Smith, 1834)

= Gray climbing mouse =

Species of rodent

The gray climbing mouse (Dendromus melanotis) is a species of rodent in the family Nesomyidae. It is found in Angola, Benin, Botswana, Democratic Republic of the Congo, Ethiopia, Guinea, Liberia, Malawi, Mozambique, Namibia, Nigeria, Rwanda, South Africa, Eswatini, Tanzania, Uganda, Zambia, and Zimbabwe. Its natural habitats are dry savanna, Mediterranean-type shrubby vegetation, subtropical or tropical dry lowland grassland, and temperate desert.

== Sources ==
- Musser, G. G.; Carleton, M. D. (2005). "Superfamily Muroidea". In Wilson, D. E.; Reeder, D. M. (eds.). Mammal Species of the World: A Taxonomic and Geographic Reference (3rd ed.). Johns Hopkins University Press. pp. 894–1531. ISBN 978-0-8018-8221-0. OCLC 62265494.
