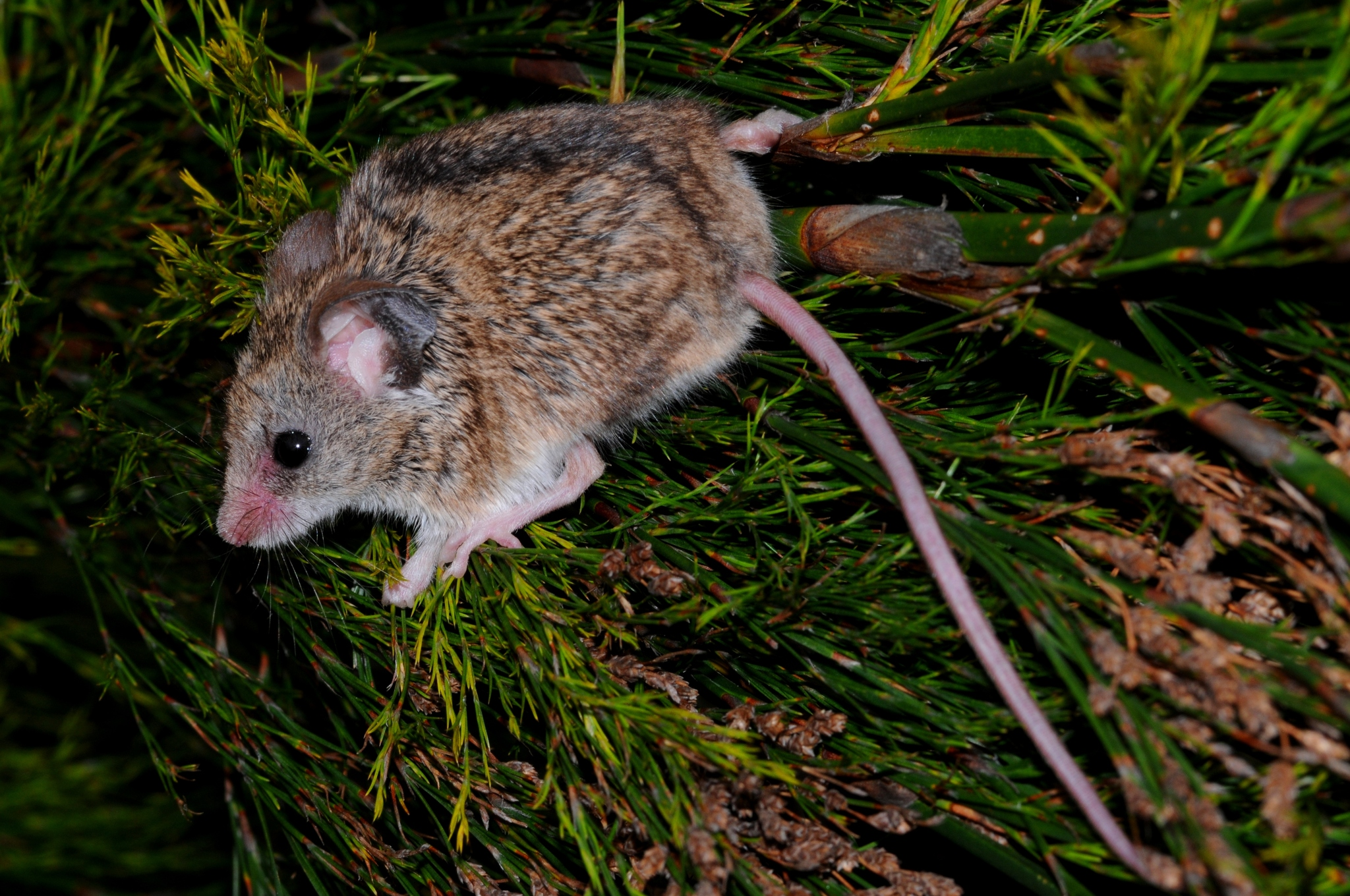

Conservation status
- Least Concern (IUCN 3.1)

Scientific classification
- Kingdom: Animalia
- Phylum: Chordata
- Class: Mammalia
- Order: Rodentia
- Family: Nesomyidae
- Genus: Dendromus
- Species: D. mesomelas

Binomial name
- Dendromus mesomelas (Brants, 1827)

= Brants's climbing mouse =

Brant's climbing mouse

Species of rodent

Brants's climbing mouse (Dendromus mesomelas) is a species of rodent in the family Nesomyidae. It is found in Botswana, Democratic Republic of the Congo, Kenya, Malawi, Mozambique, Namibia, South Africa, Tanzania, and Zambia. Its natural habitats are subtropical or tropical moist montane forests, dry savanna, Mediterranean-type shrubby vegetation, and subtropical or tropical high-altitude grassland. It has a total length of about 17 cm and weighs 14 grams. Their litters are born in summer (December to February); a litter has 2-8 pups. Their diet consists primarily of seeds and insects.
