= Nyika climbing mouse =

Conservation status
- Least Concern (IUCN 3.1)

Scientific classification
- Kingdom: Animalia
- Phylum: Chordata
- Class: Mammalia
- Order: Rodentia
- Family: Nesomyidae
- Genus: Dendromus
- Species: D. nyikae

Binomial name
- Dendromus nyikae Wroughton, 1909

Species of rodent

The Nyika climbing mouse (Dendromus nyikae) is a species of rodent in the family Nesomyidae. It is found in Angola, Democratic Republic of the Congo, Malawi, Mozambique, South Africa, Tanzania, Zambia, and Zimbabwe. Its natural habitat is moist savanna.
