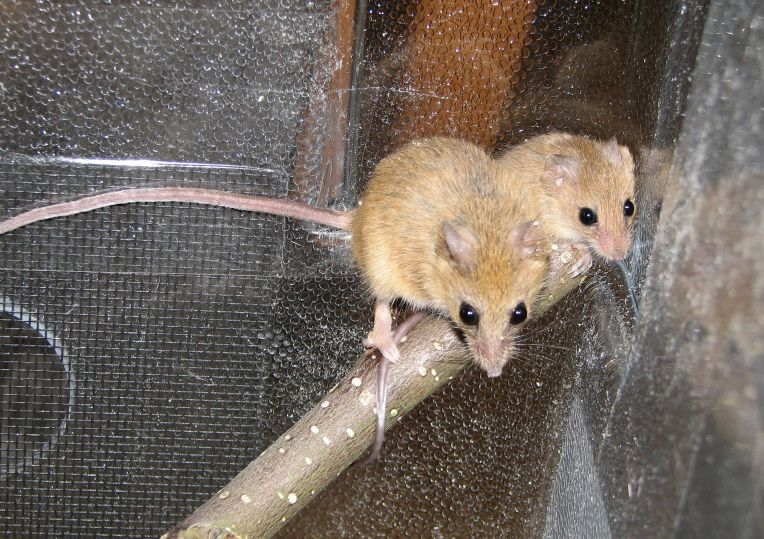

Conservation status
- Least Concern (IUCN 3.1)

Scientific classification
- Domain: Eukaryota
- Kingdom: Animalia
- Phylum: Chordata
- Class: Mammalia
- Order: Rodentia
- Family: Nesomyidae
- Genus: Dendromus
- Species: D. mystacalis

Binomial name
- Dendromus mystacalis (Heuglin, 1863)

= Chestnut climbing mouse =

Species of rodent

The chestnut climbing mouse (Dendromus mystacalis) is a species of rodent in the family Nesomyidae. It is found in Angola, Democratic Republic of the Congo, Ethiopia, Kenya, Lesotho, Malawi, Mozambique, Rwanda, South Africa, Eswatini, Tanzania, Uganda, Zambia, and Zimbabwe. Its natural habitats are dry savanna and moist savanna.
