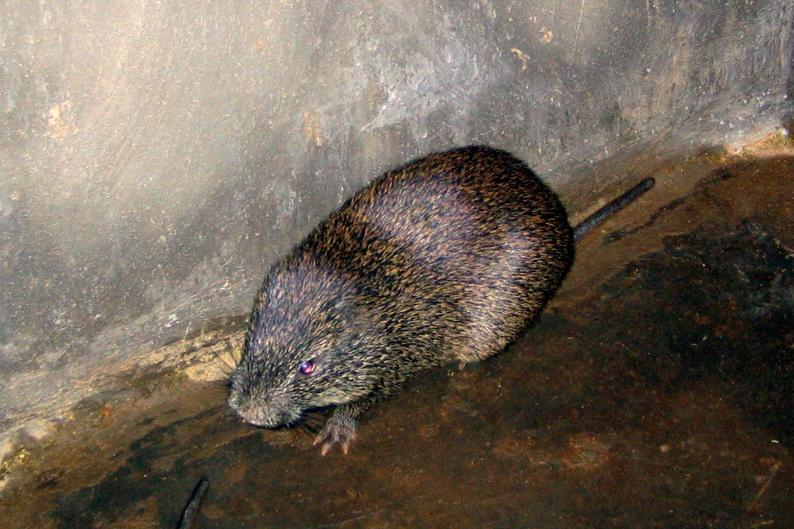

Conservation status
- Least Concern (IUCN 3.1)

Scientific classification
- Kingdom: Animalia
- Phylum: Chordata
- Class: Mammalia
- Infraclass: Placentalia
- Order: Rodentia
- Family: Thryonomyidae
- Genus: Thryonomys
- Species: T. swinderianus

Binomial name
- Thryonomys swinderianus (Temminck, 1827)
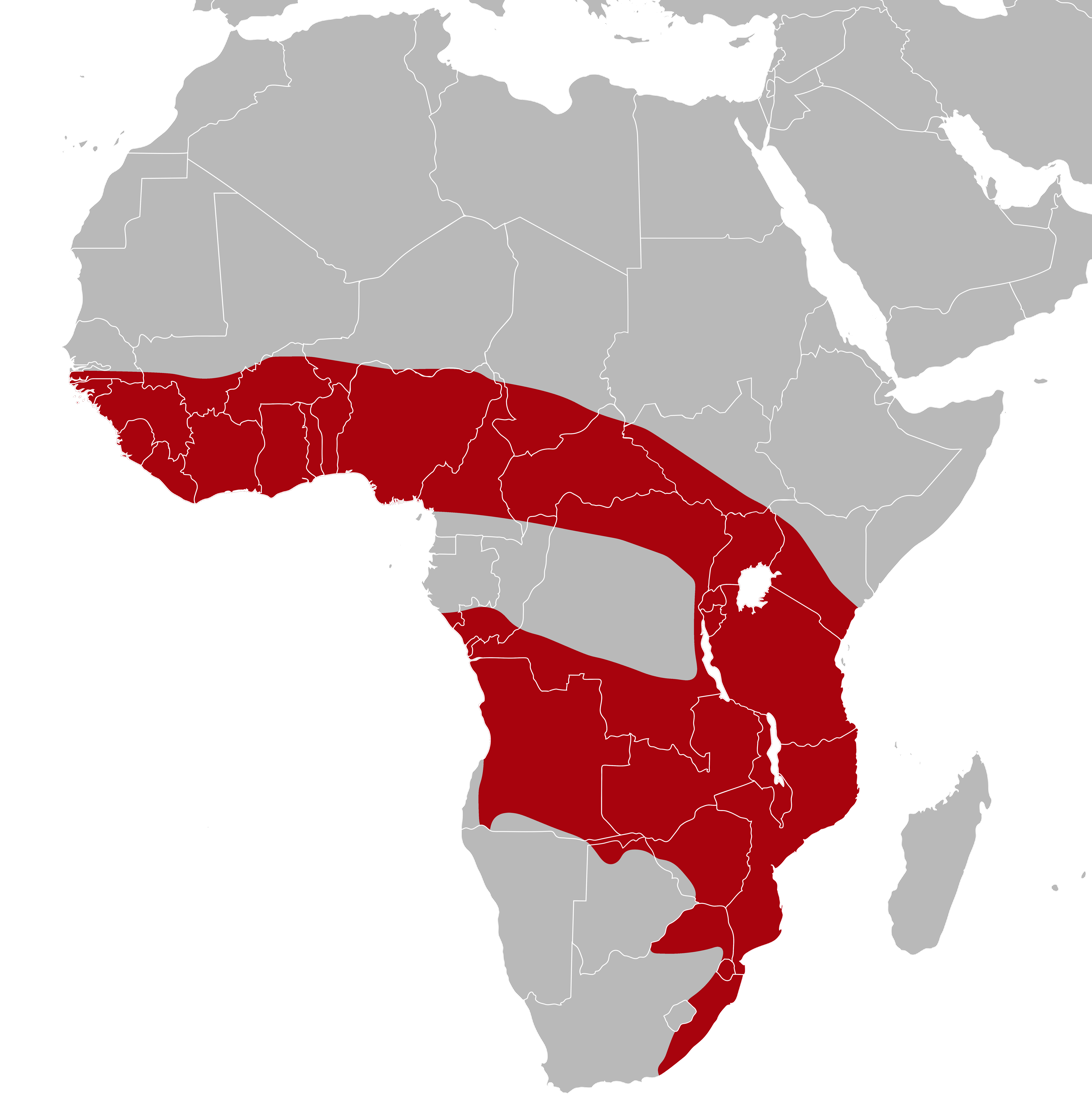

= Greater cane rat =

Species of rodent

The greater cane rat (Thryonomys swinderianus), also known as the grasscutter (in Ghana, Nigeria and other regions of West Africa), is one of two species of cane rats, a small family of African hystricognath rodents. It lives by reed-beds and riverbanks in Sub-Saharan Africa.

== Description ==
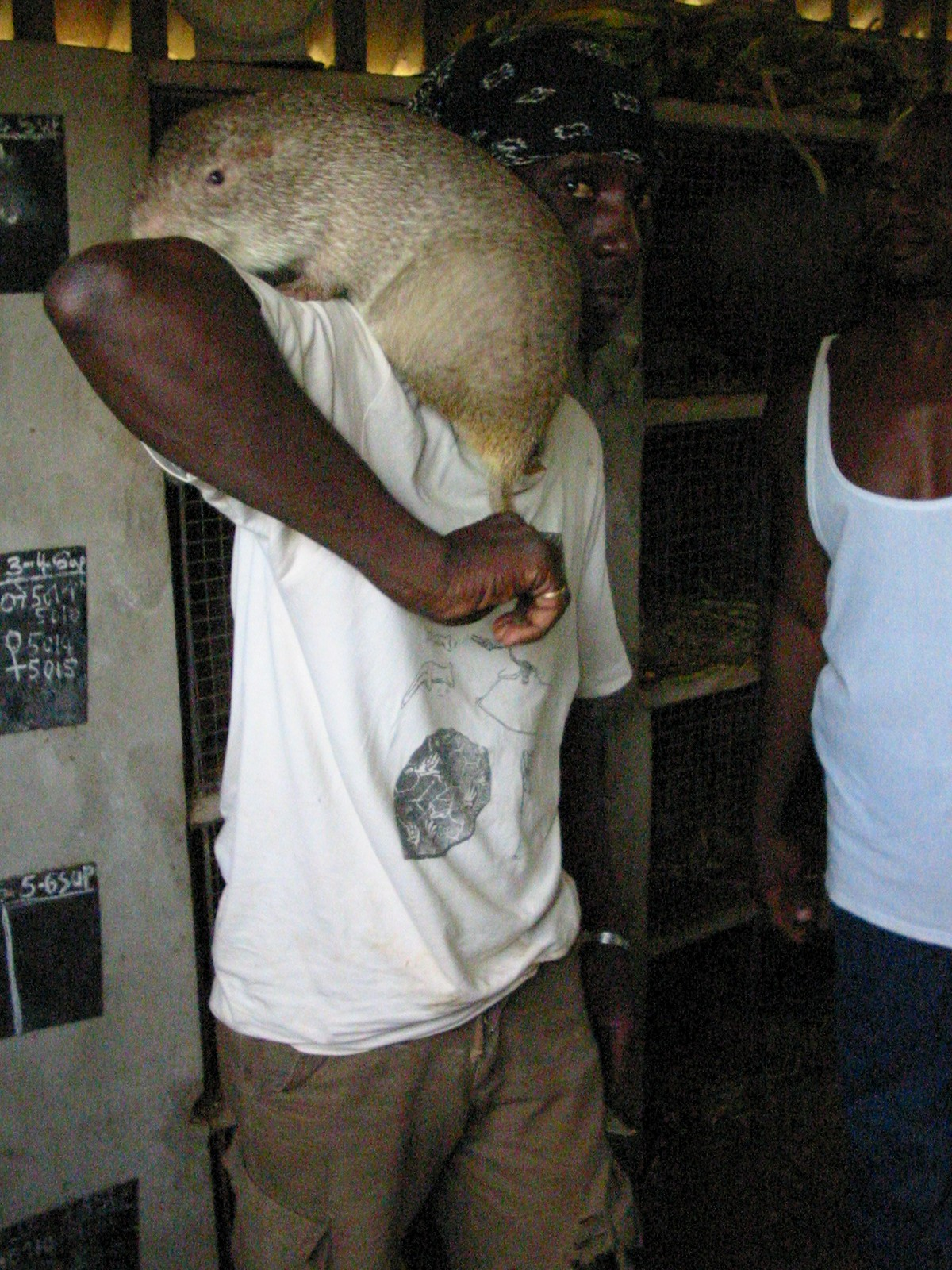
A male greater cane rat in captive breeding program in Gabon. Although one of the largest rodents in Africa and one of the largest species commonly called a "rat", it is not closely related to typical Rattus species.

Greater cane rats can measure in head-and-body length from 43 to 60 cm (17 to 24 in) with the tail measuring 16 to 19.5 cm (6.3 to 7.7 in). Typical weight is 3.2 to 5.2 kg (7.1 to 11.5 lb), in males averaging some 4.5 kg (9.9 lb), and females at 3.4 to 3.8 kg (7.5 to 8.4 lb). In some cases, greater cane rats can weigh to approximately 7 to 9 kg (15 to 20 lb). They are considered one of the largest rodents in Africa, behind only the Hystrix porcupines. It has rounded ears, a short nose, and coarse bristly hair. Its forefeet are smaller than its hind feet, each with three toes.

== Behaviour ==
Cane rats are largely independent and they live in vaguely linked groups. Foraging is done alone. They are nocturnal and make nests from grasses or burrow underground. The typically reside near bodies of water, reed-beds, and thick vegetation. Individuals of the species may live in excess of four years. If frightened, they grunt and run towards water.

== Interactions with humans ==
As humans expanded into the cane rat's native habitats, the cane rats likewise expanded from their native reeds into the plantations, particularly the sugar cane plantations from which they derive their name. Their tendency to adopt plantations as habitat, where they feed on agricultural crops such as maize, wheat, sugar-cane and cassava, often earns them the label of agricultural pest. However, the peoples of the region also utilize the cane rat as a food source (as bushmeat), considering the meat a delicacy. Consequently, these rats are beginning to be raised in cages for sale.
