= List of mammals of South Africa =

Mammal species recorded in South Africa

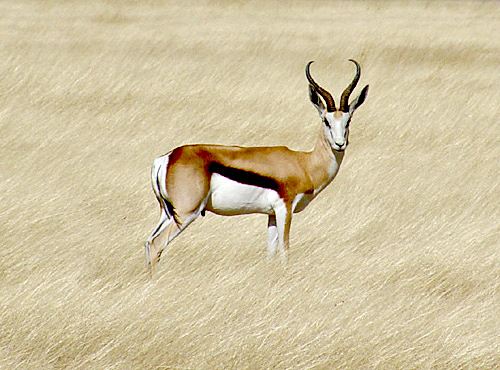
The springbok antelope (Antidorcas marsupialis) is the national animal of South Africa

This is a list of the mammal species recorded in South Africa. There are 299 mammal species in South Africa, of which two are critically endangered, eleven are endangered, fifteen are vulnerable, and thirteen are near threatened. Two of the species listed for South Africa are considered to be extinct.

The following tags are used to highlight each species' conservation status as assessed by the International Union for Conservation of Nature:

EX	Extinct	No reasonable doubt that the last individual has died.
EW	Extinct in the wild	Known only to survive in captivity or as a naturalized populations well outside its previous range.
CR	Critically endangered	The species is in imminent risk of extinction in the wild.
EN	Endangered	The species is facing an extremely high risk of extinction in the wild.
VU	Vulnerable	The species is facing a high risk of extinction in the wild.
NT	Near threatened	The species does not meet any of the criteria that would categorise it as risking extinction but it is likely to do so in the future.
LC	Least concern	There are no current identifiable risks to the species.
DD	Data deficient	There is inadequate information to make an assessment of the risks to this species.

Some species were assessed using an earlier set of criteria. Species assessed using this system have the following instead of near threatened and least concern categories:

LR/cd	Lower risk/conservation dependent	Species which were the focus of conservation programs and may have moved into a higher risk category if that program was discontinued.
LR/nt	Lower risk/not threatened	Species which are close to being classified as vulnerable but are not the subject of conservation programs.
LR/lc	Lower risk/least concern	Species for which there are no identifiable risks.

== Order: Afrosoricida (tenrecs and golden moles) ==
The order Afrosoricida contains the golden moles of southern Africa and the tenrecs of Madagascar and Africa, two families of small mammals that were traditionally part of the order Insectivora.

- Family: Chrysochloridae
  - Subfamily: Chrysochlorinae
    - Genus: Chlorotalpa
      - Duthie's golden mole, Chlorotalpa duthieae VU
      - Sclater's golden mole, Chlorotalpa sclateri LC
    - Genus: Chrysochloris
      - Cape golden mole, Chrysochloris asiatica LC
      - Visagie's golden mole, Chrysochloris visagiei DD
    - Genus: Chrysospalax
      - Giant golden mole, Chrysospalax trevelyani EN
      - Rough-haired golden mole, Chrysospalax villosus VU
    - Genus: Cryptochloris
      - De Winton's golden mole, Cryptochloris wintoni CR
      - Van Zyl's golden mole, Cryptochloris zyli EN
    - Genus: Eremitalpa
      - Grant's golden mole, Eremitalpa granti NT
  - Subfamily: Amblysominae
    - Genus: Amblysomus
      - Fynbos golden mole, Amblysomus corriae NT
      - Hottentot golden mole, Amblysomus hottentotus LC
      - Marley's golden mole, Amblysomus marleyi EN
      - Robust golden mole, Amblysomus robustus VU
      - Highveld golden mole, Amblysomus septentrionalis NT
    - Genus: Calcochloris
      - Yellow golden mole, Calcochloris obtusirostris LC
    - Genus: Neamblysomus
      - Gunning's golden mole, Neamblysomus gunningi EN
      - Juliana's golden mole, Neamblysomus julianae EN

== Order: Macroscelidea (elephant-shrews) ==
Often called sengis, the elephant shrews or jumping shrews are native to southern Africa. Their common English name derives from their elongated flexible snout and their resemblance to the true shrews.

- Family: Macroscelididae (elephant-shrews)
  - Genus: Elephantulus
    - Short-snouted sengi, Elephantulus brachyrhynchus LC
    - Cape sengi, Elephantulus edwardii LC
    - Bushveld sengi, Elephantulus intufi LC
    - Eastern rock sengi, Elephantulus myurus LC
    - Western rock sengi, Elephantulus rupestris LC
  - Genus: Macroscelides
    - Short-eared elephant shrew, Macroscelides proboscideus LC
  - Genus: Petrodromus
    - Four-toed sengi, Petrodromus tetradactylus LC

== Order: Tubulidentata (aardvarks) ==
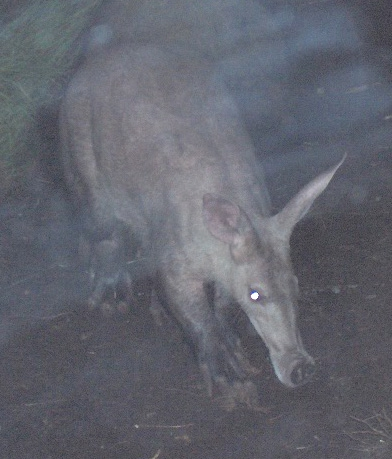
Aardvark

The order Tubulidentata consists of a single species, the aardvark. Tubulidentata are characterised by their teeth which lack a pulp cavity and form thin tubes which are continuously worn down and replaced.

- Family: Orycteropodidae
  - Genus: Orycteropus
    - Aardvark, Orycteropus afer LC

== Order: Hyracoidea (hyraxes) ==
The hyraxes are any of four species of fairly small, thickset, herbivorous mammals in the order Hyracoidea. About the size of a domestic cat they are well-furred, with rounded bodies and a stumpy tail. They are native to Africa and the Middle East.

- Family: Procaviidae (hyraxes)
  - Genus: Dendrohyrax
    - Southern tree hyrax, Dendrohyrax arboreus LC
  - Genus: Heterohyrax
    - Yellow-spotted rock hyrax, Heterohyrax brucei LC
  - Genus: Procavia
    - Cape hyrax, Procavia capensis LC

== Order: Proboscidea (elephants) ==
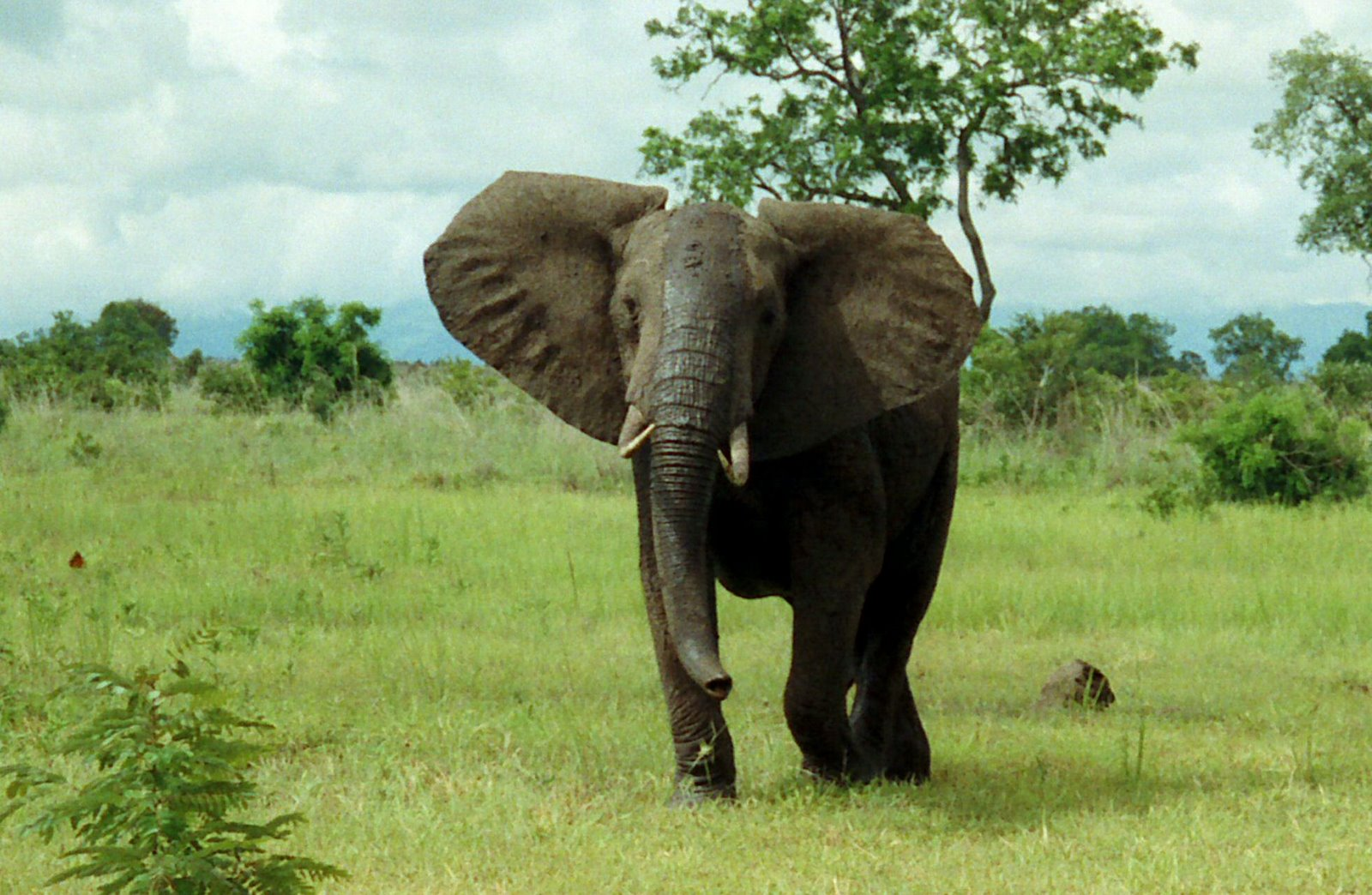
African bush elephant

The elephants comprise three living species and are the largest living land animals.

- Family: Elephantidae (elephants)
  - Genus: Loxodonta
    - African bush elephant, Loxodonta africana EN

== Order: Primates ==
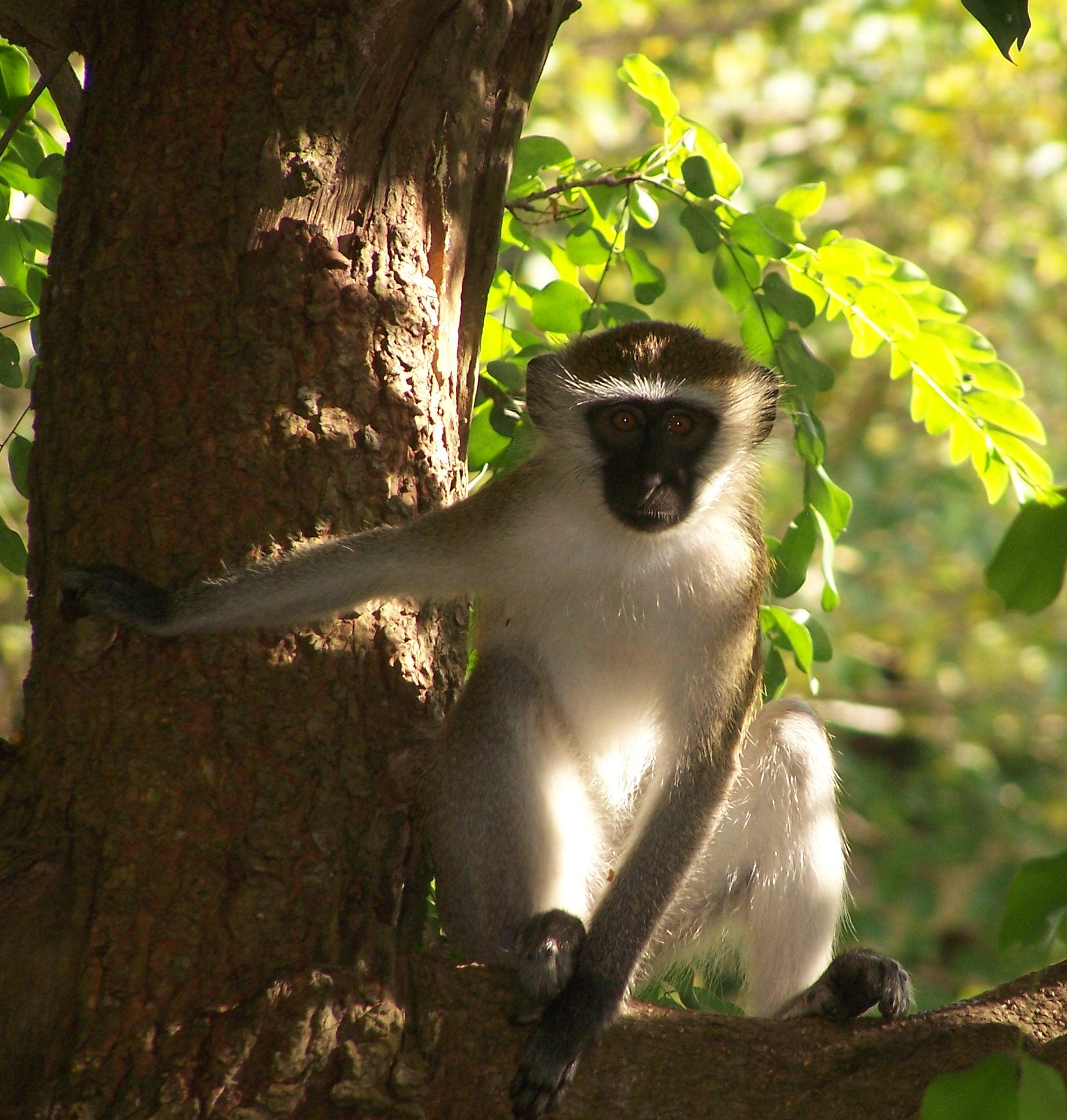
Vervet monkey

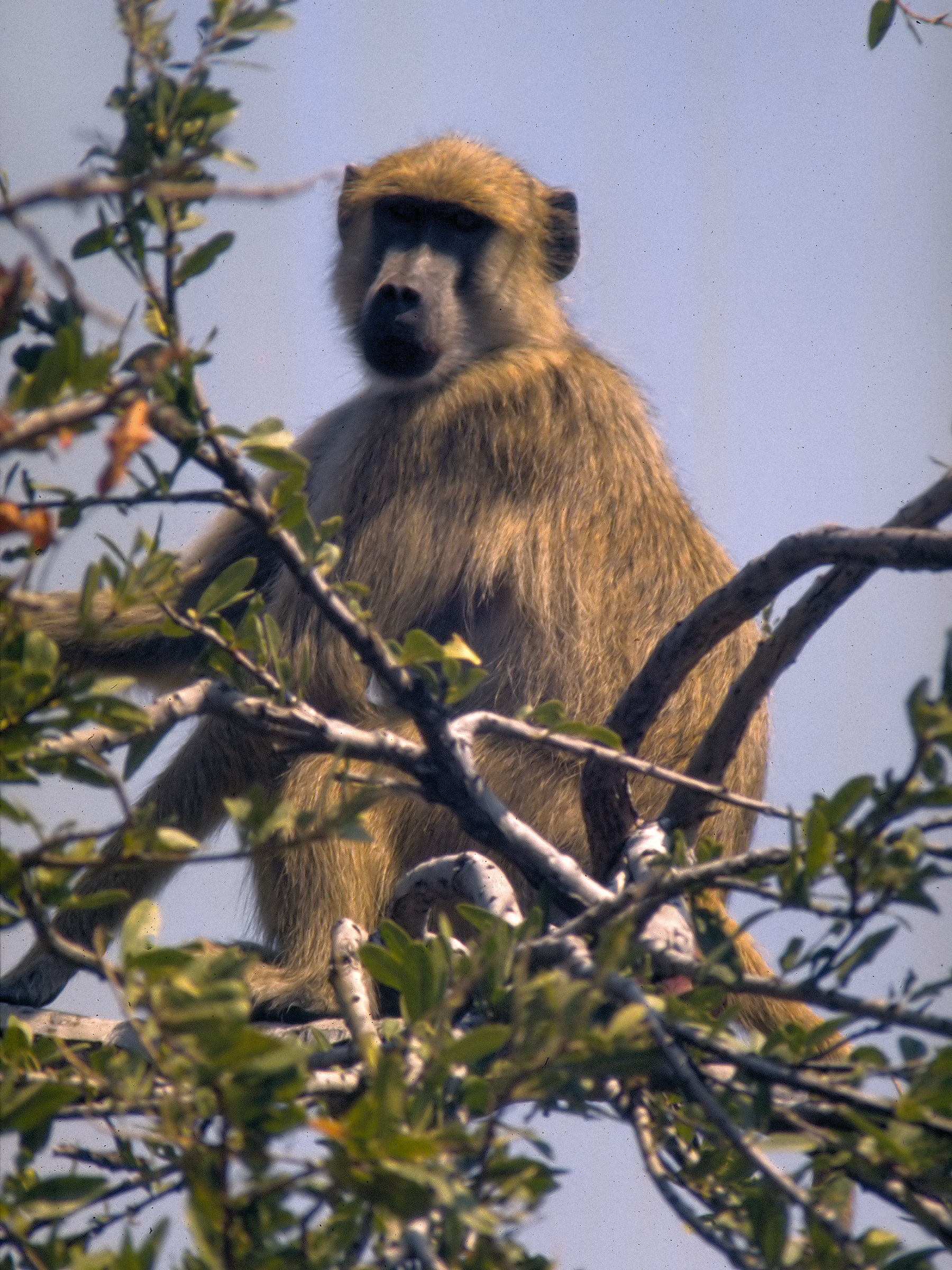
Chacma baboon

The order Primates contains humans and their closest relatives: lemurs, lorisoids, tarsiers, monkeys, and apes.

- Suborder: Strepsirrhini
  - Infraorder: Lemuriformes
    - Superfamily: Lorisoidea
      - Family: Galagidae
        - Genus: Galago
          - Mohol galago, Galago moholi LR/lc
        - Genus: Otolemur
          - Brown greater galago, Otolemur crassicaudatus LR/lc
- Suborder: Haplorhini
  - Infraorder: Simiiformes
    - Parvorder: Catarrhini
      - Superfamily: Cercopithecoidea
        - Family: Cercopithecidae (Old World monkeys)
          - Genus: Cercopithecus
            - Sykes' monkey, Cercopithecus albogularis LR/lc
          - Genus: Chlorocebus
            - Vervet monkey, Chlorocebus pygerythrus LR/lc
          - Genus: Papio
            - Chacma baboon, Papio ursinus LR/lc

== Order: Rodentia (rodents) ==
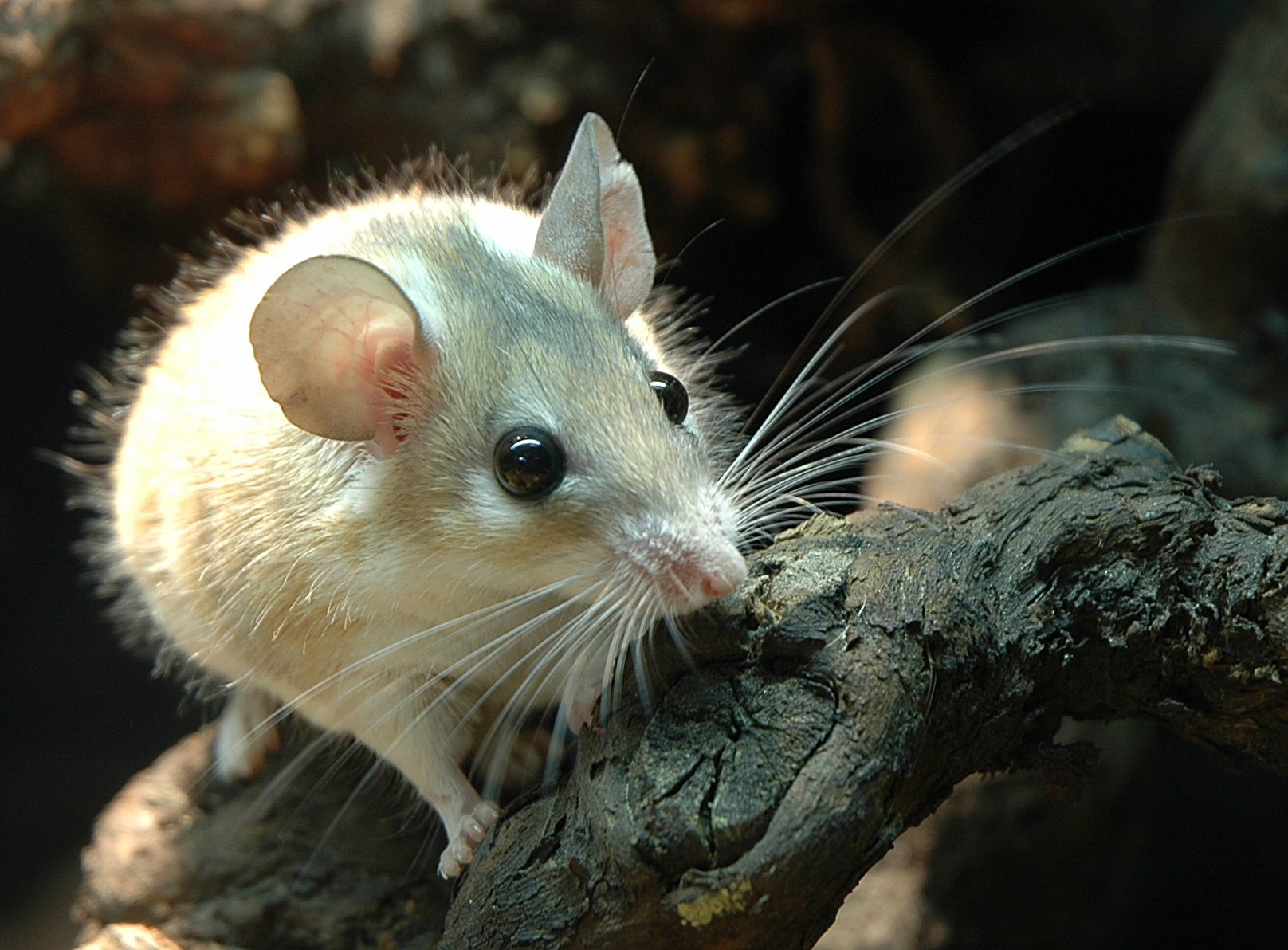
Spiny mouse

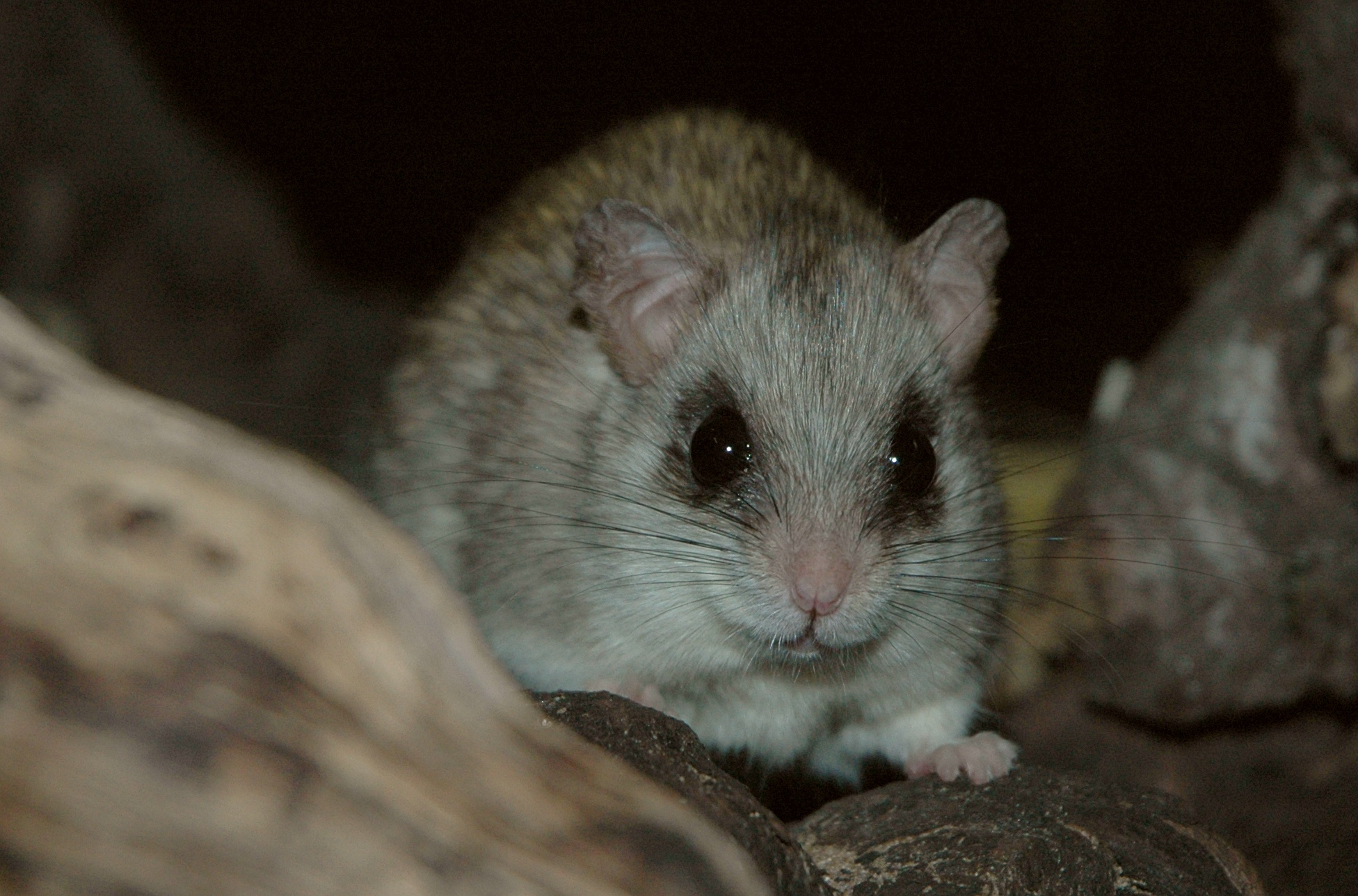
Acacia rat

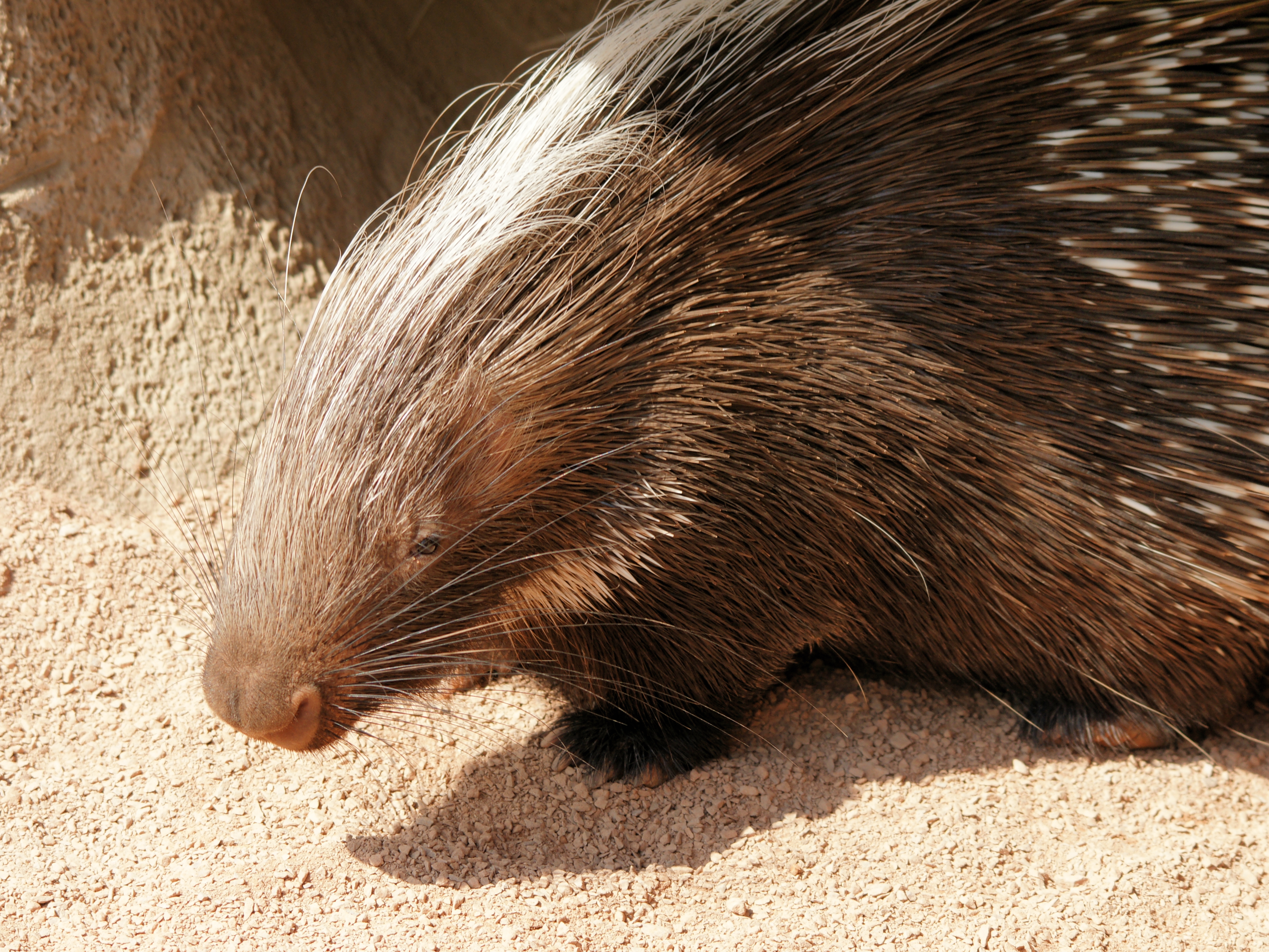
Cape porcupine

Rodents make up the largest order of mammals, with over 40% of mammalian species. They have two incisors in the upper and lower jaw which grow continually and must be kept short by gnawing. Most rodents are small though the capybara can weigh up to 45 kg (99 lb).

- Suborder: Hystricognathi
  - Family: Bathyergidae
    - Genus: Bathyergus
      - Namaqua dune mole-rat, Bathyergus janetta LC
      - Cape dune mole-rat, Bathyergus suillus LC
    - Genus: Cryptomys
      - Damaraland mole-rat, Cryptomys damarensis LC
      - Common mole-rat, Cryptomys hottentotus LC
    - Genus: Georychus
      - Cape mole-rat, Georychus capensis LC
  - Family: Hystricidae (Old World porcupines)
    - Genus: Hystrix
      - Cape porcupine, Hystrix africaeaustralis LC
  - Family: Petromuridae
    - Genus: Petromus
      - Dassie rat, Petromus typicus LC
  - Family: Thryonomyidae (cane rats)
    - Genus: Thryonomys
      - Greater cane rat, Thryonomys swinderianus LC
- Suborder: Sciurognathi
  - Family: Pedetidae (spring hares)
    - Genus: Pedetes
      - Springhare, Pedetes capensis LC
  - Family: Sciuridae (squirrels)
    - Subfamily: Xerinae
      - Tribe: Xerini
        - Genus: Xerus
          - South African ground squirrel, Xerus inauris LC
          - Mountain ground squirrel, Xerus princeps LC
      - Tribe: Protoxerini
        - Genus: Paraxerus
          - Smith's bush squirrel, Paraxerus cepapi LC
          - Red bush squirrel, Paraxerus palliatus LC
  - Family: Gliridae (dormice)
    - Subfamily: Graphiurinae
      - Genus: Graphiurus
        - Small-eared dormouse, Graphiurus microtis LC
        - Woodland dormouse, Graphiurus murinus LC
        - Spectacled dormouse, Graphiurus ocularis LC
        - Rock dormouse, Graphiurus platyops LC
        - Stone dormouse, Graphiurus rupicola LC
  - Family: Nesomyidae
    - Subfamily: Petromyscinae
      - Genus: Petromyscus
        - Barbour's rock mouse, Petromyscus barbouri LC
        - Pygmy rock mouse, Petromyscus collinus LC
        - Brukkaros pygmy rock mouse, Petromyscus monticularis LC
    - Subfamily: Dendromurinae
      - Genus: Dendromus
        - Gray climbing mouse, Dendromus melanotis LC
        - Brants's climbing mouse, Dendromus mesomelas LC
        - Chestnut climbing mouse, Dendromus mystacalis LC
        - Nyika climbing mouse, Dendromus nyikae LC
      - Genus: Malacothrix
        - Gerbil mouse, Malacothrix typica LC
      - Genus: Steatomys
        - Kreb's fat mouse, Steatomys krebsii LC
        - Fat mouse, Steatomys pratensis LC
    - Subfamily: Mystromyinae
      - Genus: Mystromys
        - White-tailed rat, Mystromys albicaudatus EN
    - Subfamily: Cricetomyinae
      - Genus: Cricetomys
        - Gambian pouched rat, Cricetomys gambianus LC
      - Genus: Saccostomus
        - South African pouched mouse, Saccostomus campestris LC
  - Family: Muridae (mice, rats, voles, gerbils, hamsters, etc.)
    - Subfamily: Deomyinae
      - Genus: Acomys
        - Spiny mouse, Acomys spinosissimus LC
        - Cape spiny mouse, Acomys subspinosus LC
    - Subfamily: Otomyinae
      - Genus: Otomys
        - Angoni vlei rat, Otomys angoniensis LC
        - Vlei rat, Otomys irroratus LC
        - Laminate vlei rat, Otomys laminatus LC
        - Saunder's vlei rat, Otomys saundersiae LC
        - Sloggett's vlei rat, Otomys sloggetti LC
        - Bush vlei rat, Otomys unisulcatus LC
      - Genus: Parotomys
        - Brants's whistling rat, Parotomys brantsii LC
        - Littledale's whistling rat, Parotomys littledalei LC
    - Subfamily: Gerbillinae
      - Genus: Desmodillus
        - Cape short-eared gerbil, Desmodillus auricularis LC
      - Genus: Gerbillurus
        - Hairy-footed gerbil, Gerbillurus paeba LC
        - Bushy-tailed hairy-footed gerbil, Gerbillurus vallinus LC
      - Genus: Tatera
        - Cape gerbil, Tatera afra LC
        - Highveld gerbil, Tatera brantsii LC
        - Bushveld gerbil, Tatera leucogaster LC
    - Subfamily: Murinae
      - Genus: Aethomys
        - Red rock rat, Aethomys chrysophilus LC
        - Grant's rock rat, Aethomys granti LC
        - Tete veld aethomys, Aethomys ineptus LC
        - Namaqua rock rat, Aethomys namaquensis LC
      - Genus: Dasymys
        - African marsh rat, Dasymys incomtus LC
      - Genus: Grammomys
        - Mozambique thicket rat, Grammomys cometes LC
        - Woodland thicket rat, Grammomys dolichurus LC
      - Genus: Lemniscomys
        - Single-striped grass mouse, Lemniscomys rosalia LC
      - Genus: Mastomys
        - Southern multimammate mouse, Mastomys coucha LC
        - Natal multimammate mouse, Mastomys natalensis LC
      - Genus: Mus
        - Desert pygmy mouse, Mus indutus LC
        - African pygmy mouse, Mus minutoides LC
        - Neave's mouse, Mus neavei DD
        - Orange mouse, Mus orangiae LC
      - Genus: Myomyscus
        - Verreaux's mouse, Myomyscus verreauxii LC
      - Genus: Rhabdomys
        - Four-striped grass mouse, Rhabdomys pumilio LC
      - Genus: Thallomys
        - Black-tailed tree rat, Thallomys nigricauda LC
        - Acacia rat, Thallomys paedulcus LC
        - Shortridge's rat, Thallomys shortridgei DD
      - Genus: Zelotomys
        - Woosnam's broad-headed mouse, Zelotomys woosnami LC

== Order: Lagomorpha (lagomorphs) ==
The lagomorphs comprise two families, Leporidae (hares and rabbits), and Ochotonidae (pikas). Though they can resemble rodents, and were classified as a superfamily in that order until the early 20th century, they have since been considered a separate order. They differ from rodents in a number of physical characteristics, such as having four incisors in the upper jaw rather than two.

- Family: Leporidae (rabbits, hares)
  - Genus: Bunolagus
    - Riverine rabbit, Bunolagus monticularis CR
  - Genus: Pronolagus
    - Natal red rock hare, Pronolagus crassicaudatus LR/lc
    - Jameson's red rock hare, Pronolagus randensis LR/lc
    - Smith's red rock hare, Pronolagus rupestris LR/lc
    - Hewitt's red rock hare, Pronolagus saundersiae LR/lc
  - Genus: Lepus
    - Cape hare, Lepus capensis LR/lc
    - African savanna hare, Lepus microtis LR/lc
    - Scrub hare, Lepus saxatilis LR/lc

== Order: Eulipotyphla (shrews, moles, hedgehogs and gymnures) ==
The order Eulipotyphla constitutes four families, two of which are found in South Africa. The Soricidae family are made up of shrews, whilst the Erinaceidae family are composed of the hedgehogs and gymnures. Hedgehogs are easily recognised by their spines whilst the shrews are more rat-like in appearance.

- Family: Erinaceidae (hedgehogs)
  - Subfamily: Erinaceinae
    - Genus: Atelerix
      - Southern African hedgehog, Atelerix frontalis LR/lc
- Family: Soricidae (shrews)
  - Subfamily: Crocidurinae
    - Genus: Crocidura
      - Reddish-gray musk shrew, Crocidura cyanea LC
      - Greater red musk shrew, Crocidura flavescens LC
      - Tiny musk shrew, Crocidura fuscomurina LC
      - Lesser red musk shrew, Crocidura hirta LC
      - Maquassie musk shrew, Crocidura maquassiensis LC
      - Swamp musk shrew, Crocidura mariquensis LC
      - Lesser gray-brown musk shrew, Crocidura silacea LC
    - Genus: Suncus
      - Least dwarf shrew, Suncus infinitesimus LC
      - Greater dwarf shrew, Suncus lixus LC
      - Lesser dwarf shrew, Suncus varilla LC
  - Subfamily: Myosoricinae
    - Genus: Myosorex
      - Dark-footed forest shrew, Myosorex cafer LC
      - Long-tailed forest shrew, Myosorex longicaudatus VU
      - Sclater's tiny mouse shrew, Myosorex sclateri VU
      - Thin mouse shrew, Myosorex tenuis DD
      - Forest shrew, Myosorex varius LC

== Order: Chiroptera (bats) ==
The bats' most distinguishing feature is that their forelimbs are developed as wings, making them the only mammals capable of flight. Bat species account for about 20% of all mammals.

- Family: Pteropodidae (flying foxes, Old World fruit bats)
  - Subfamily: Pteropodinae
    - Genus: Eidolon
      - Straw-coloured fruit bat, Eidolon helvum LC
    - Genus: Epomophorus
      - Peters's epauletted fruit bat, Epomophorus crypturus LC
      - Wahlberg's epauletted fruit bat, Epomophorus wahlbergi LC
    - Genus: Rousettus
      - Egyptian fruit bat, Rousettus aegyptiacus LC
- Family: Vespertilionidae
  - Subfamily: Kerivoulinae
    - Genus: Kerivoula
      - Damara woolly bat, Kerivoula argentata LC
      - Lesser woolly bat, Kerivoula lanosa LC
  - Subfamily: Myotinae
    - Genus: Cistugo
      - Lesueur's hairy bat, Cistugo lesueuri VU
      - Angolan hairy bat, Cistugo seabrai NT
    - Genus: Myotis
      - Rufous mouse-eared bat, Myotis bocagii LC
      - Cape hairy bat, Myotis tricolor LC
      - Welwitsch's bat, Myotis welwitschii LC
  - Subfamily: Vespertilioninae
    - Genus: Eptesicus
      - Long-tailed house bat, Eptesicus hottentotus LC
      - Somali serotine, Eptesicus somalicus DD
    - Genus: Glauconycteris
      - Butterfly bat, Glauconycteris variegata LC
    - Genus: Hypsugo
      - Anchieta's pipistrelle, Hypsugo anchietae LC
    - Genus: Laephotis
      - Botswanan long-eared bat, Laephotis botswanae LC
      - De Winton's long-eared bat, Laephotis wintoni LC
    - Genus: Neoromicia
      - Cape serotine, Neoromicia capensis LC
      - Melck's house bat, Neoromicia melckorum DD
      - Banana pipistrelle, Neoromicia nanus LC
      - Rendall's serotine, Neoromicia rendalli LC
      - Zulu serotine, Neoromicia zuluensis LC
    - Genus: Nycticeinops
      - Schlieffen's bat, Nycticeinops schlieffeni LC
    - Genus: Pipistrellus
      - Rüppell's pipistrelle, Pipistrellus rueppelli LC
      - Rusty pipistrelle, Pipistrellus rusticus LC
    - Genus: Scotoecus
      - Light-winged lesser house bat, Scotoecus albofuscus DD
    - Genus: Scotophilus
      - African yellow bat, Scotophilus dinganii LC
      - Greenish yellow bat, Scotophilus viridis LC
  - Subfamily: Miniopterinae
    - Genus: Miniopterus
      - Lesser long-fingered bat, Miniopterus fraterculus LC
      - Natal long-fingered bat, Miniopterus natalensis NT
- Family: Molossidae
  - Genus: Chaerephon
    - Ansorge's free-tailed bat, Chaerephon ansorgei LC
    - Little free-tailed bat, Chaerephon pumila LC
  - Genus: Mops
    - Angolan free-tailed bat, Mops condylurus LC
    - Midas free-tailed bat, Mops midas LC
  - Genus: Mormopterus
    - Natal free-tailed bat, Mormopterus acetabulosus VU
  - Genus: Otomops
    - Large-eared free-tailed bat, Otomops martiensseni NT
  - Genus: Sauromys
    - Roberts's flat-headed bat, Sauromys petrophilus LC
  - Genus: Tadarida
    - Egyptian free-tailed bat, Tadarida aegyptiaca LC
    - Madagascan large free-tailed bat, Tadarida fulminans LC
    - African giant free-tailed bat, Tadarida ventralis NT
- Family: Emballonuridae
  - Genus: Taphozous
    - Mauritian tomb bat, Taphozous mauritianus LC
- Family: Nycteridae
  - Genus: Nycteris
    - Egyptian slit-faced bat, Nycteris thebaica LC
    - Wood's slit-faced bat, Nycteris woodi NT
- Family: Rhinolophidae
  - Subfamily: Rhinolophinae
    - Genus: Rhinolophus
      - Blasius's horseshoe bat, Rhinolophus blasii LC
      - Cape horseshoe bat, Rhinolophus capensis NT
      - Geoffroy's horseshoe bat, Rhinolophus clivosus LC
      - Darling's horseshoe bat, Rhinolophus darlingi LC
      - Dent's horseshoe bat, Rhinolophus denti DD
      - Rüppell's horseshoe bat, Rhinolophus fumigatus LC
      - Hildebrandt's horseshoe bat, Rhinolophus hildebrandti LC
      - Lander's horseshoe bat, Rhinolophus landeri LC
      - Bushveld horseshoe bat, Rhinolophus simulator LC
      - Swinny's horseshoe bat, Rhinolophus swinnyi NT
  - Subfamily: Hipposiderinae
    - Genus: Cloeotis
      - Percival's trident bat, Cloeotis percivali VU
    - Genus: Hipposideros
      - Sundevall's roundleaf bat, Hipposideros caffer LC

== Order: Pholidota (pangolins) ==
The order Pholidota comprises the eight species of pangolin. Pangolins are anteaters and have the powerful claws, elongated snout and long tongue seen in the other unrelated anteater species.

- Family: Manidae
  - Genus: Manis
    - Ground pangolin, Manis temminckii LR/nt

== Order: Cetacea (whales) ==
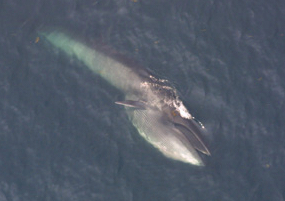
Sei whale

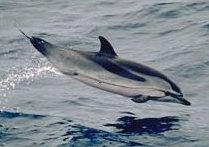
Striped dolphin

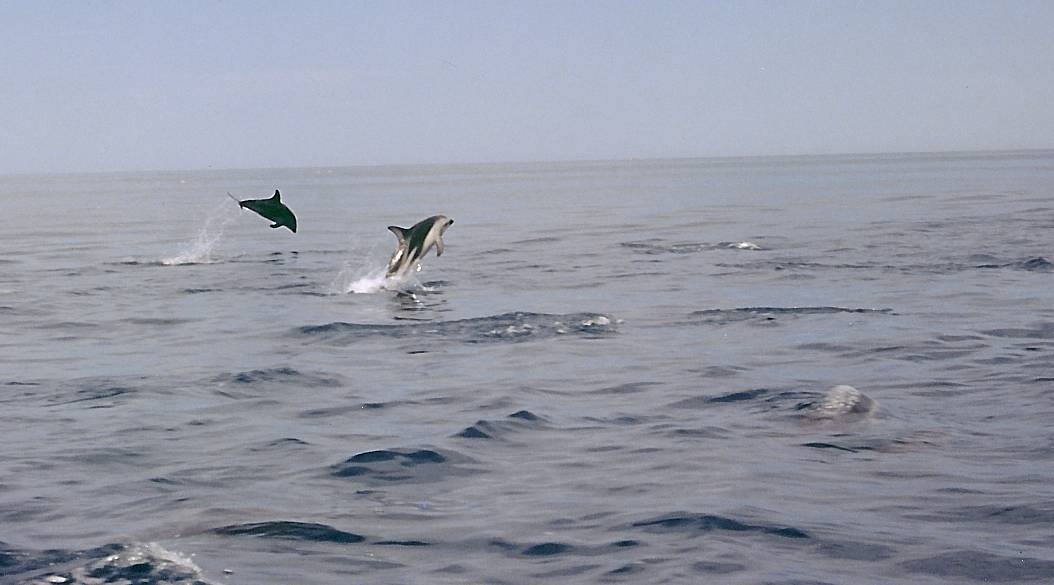
Dusky dolphin

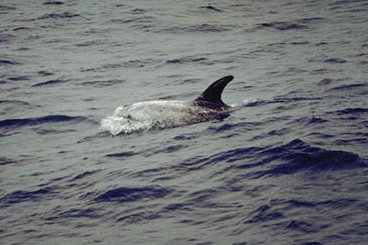
Risso's dolphin

The order Cetacea includes whales, dolphins and porpoises. They are the mammals most fully adapted to aquatic life with a spindle-shaped nearly hairless body, protected by a thick layer of blubber, and forelimbs and tail modified to provide propulsion underwater.

- Suborder: Mysticeti
  - Family: Balaenidae
    - Genus: Eubalaena
      - Southern right whale, Eubalaena australis LR/cd
  - Family: Balaenopteridae
    - Subfamily: Balaenopterinae
      - Genus: Balaenoptera
        - Common minke whale, Balaenoptera acutorostrata LR/nt
        - Antarctic minke whale, Balaenoptera bonaerensis DD
        - Sei whale, Balaenoptera borealis EN
        - Bryde's whale, Balaenoptera edeni DD
        - Blue whale, Balaenoptera musculus EN
        - Fin whale, Balaenoptera physalus EN
    - Subfamily: Megapterinae
      - Genus: Megaptera
        - Humpback whale, Megaptera novaeangliae LR
  - Family: Neobalaenidae
    - Genus: Caperea
      - Pygmy right whale, Caperea marginata LR/lc
- Suborder: Odontoceti
  - Superfamily: Platanistoidea
    - Family: Physeteridae
      - Genus: Physeter
        - Sperm whale, Physeter macrocephalus VU
    - Family: Kogiidae
      - Genus: Kogia
        - Pygmy sperm whale, Kogia breviceps LR/lc
        - Dwarf sperm whale, Kogia sima LR/lc
    - Family: Ziphidae
      - Genus: Ziphius
        - Cuvier's beaked whale, Ziphius cavirostris DD
      - Genus: Berardius
        - Giant beaked whale, Berardius arnuxii LR/cd
      - Genus: Tasmacetus
        - Shepherd's beaked whale, Tasmacetus shepherdi DD
      - Subfamily: Hyperoodontinae
        - Genus: Indopacetus
          - Longman's beaked whale, Indopacetus pacificus DD
        - Genus: Hyperoodon
          - Southern bottlenose whale, Hyperoodon planifrons LR/cd
        - Genus: Mesoplodon
          - Blainville's beaked whale, Mesoplodon densirostris DD
          - Gray's beaked whale, Mesoplodon grayi DD
          - Hector's beaked whale, Mesoplodon hectori DD
          - Layard's beaked whale, Mesoplodon layardii DD
          - True's beaked whale, Mesoplodon mirus DD
    - Family: Delphinidae (marine dolphins)
      - Genus: Cephalorhynchus
        - Heaviside's dolphin, Cephalorhynchus heavisidii DD
      - Genus: Steno
        - Rough-toothed dolphin, Steno bredanensis DD
      - Genus: Sousa
        - Indian humpback dolphin, Sousa plumbea DD
      - Genus: Tursiops
        - Indo-Pacific bottlenose dolphin, Tursiops aduncus DD
        - Common bottlenose dolphin, Tursiops truncatus DD
      - Genus: Stenella
        - Pantropical spotted dolphin, Stenella attenuata LR/cd
        - Striped dolphin, Stenella coeruleoalba LR/cd
        - Spinner dolphin, Stenella longirostris LR/cd
      - Genus: Delphinus
        - Long-beaked common dolphin, Delphinus capensis LR/lc
      - Genus: Lagenodelphis
        - Fraser's dolphin, Lagenodelphis hosei DD
      - Genus: Sagmatias
        - Hourglass dolphin, Sagmatias cruciger LR/lc
        - Dusky dolphin, Sagmatias obscurus DD
      - Genus: Lissodelphis
        - Southern right whale dolphin, Lissodelphis peronii DD
      - Genus: Grampus
        - Risso's dolphin, Grampus griseus DD
      - Genus: Peponocephala
        - Melon-headed whale, Peponocephala electra LR/lc
      - Genus: Feresa
        - Pygmy killer whale, Feresa attenuata DD
      - Genus: Pseudorca
        - False killer whale, Pseudorca crassidens LR/lc
      - Genus: Orcinus
        - Orca, Orcinus orca LR/cd
      - Genus: Globicephala
        - Short-finned pilot whale, Globicephala macrorhynchus LR/cd
        - Long-finned pilot whale, Globicephala melas LR/lc

== Order: Carnivora (carnivorans) ==
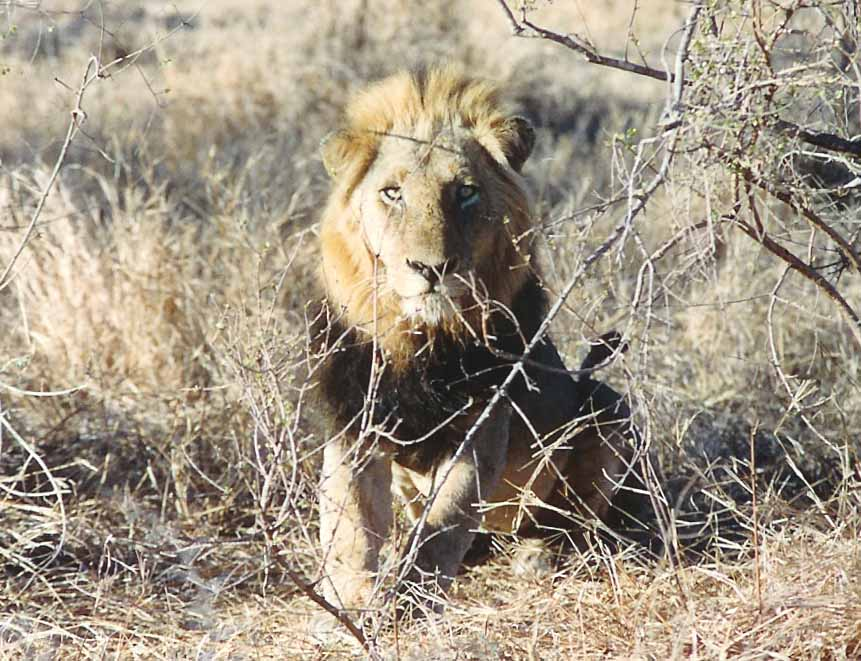
Lion in Kruger National Park

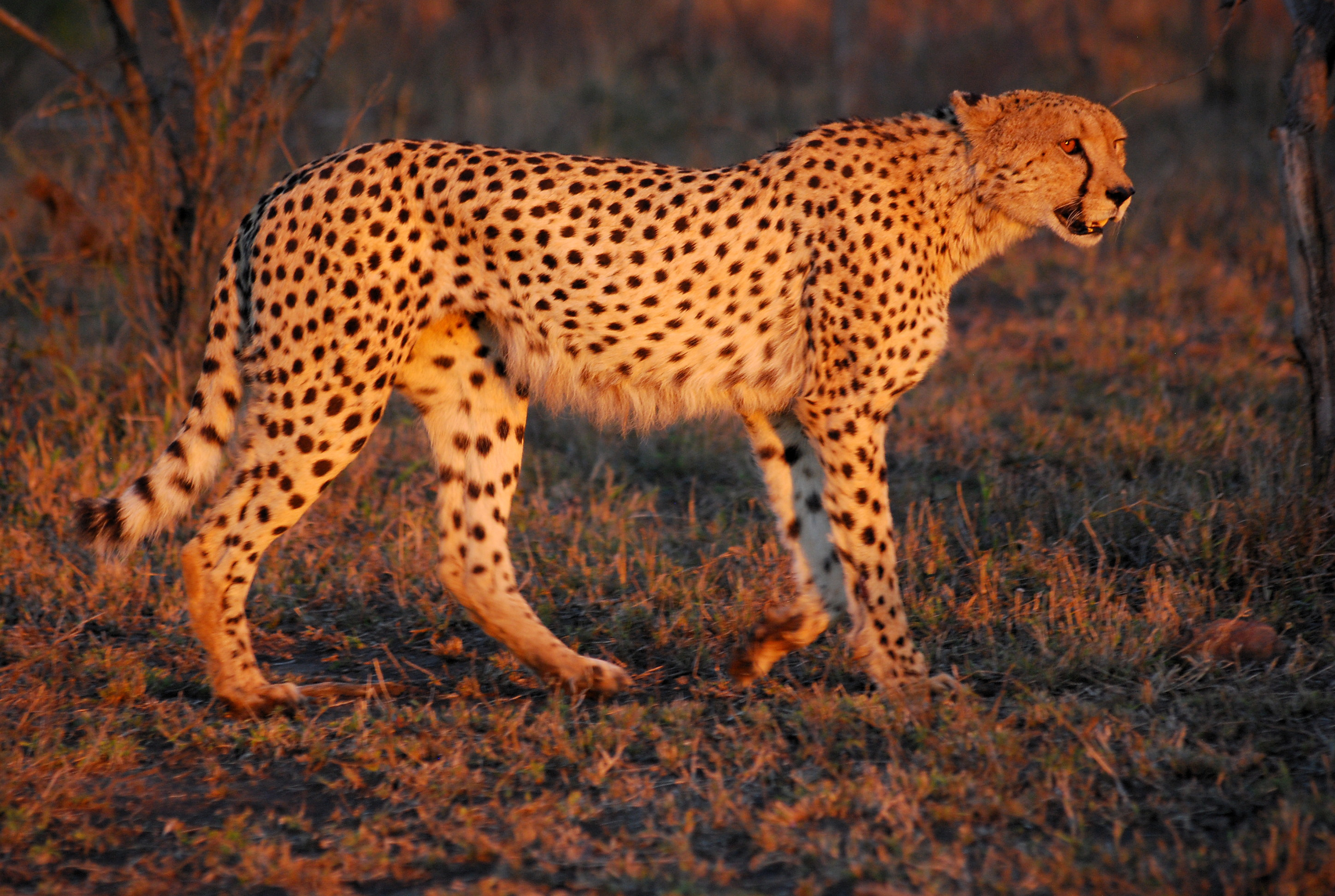
Cheetah in Hluhluwe-Umfolozi Game Reserve, South Africa

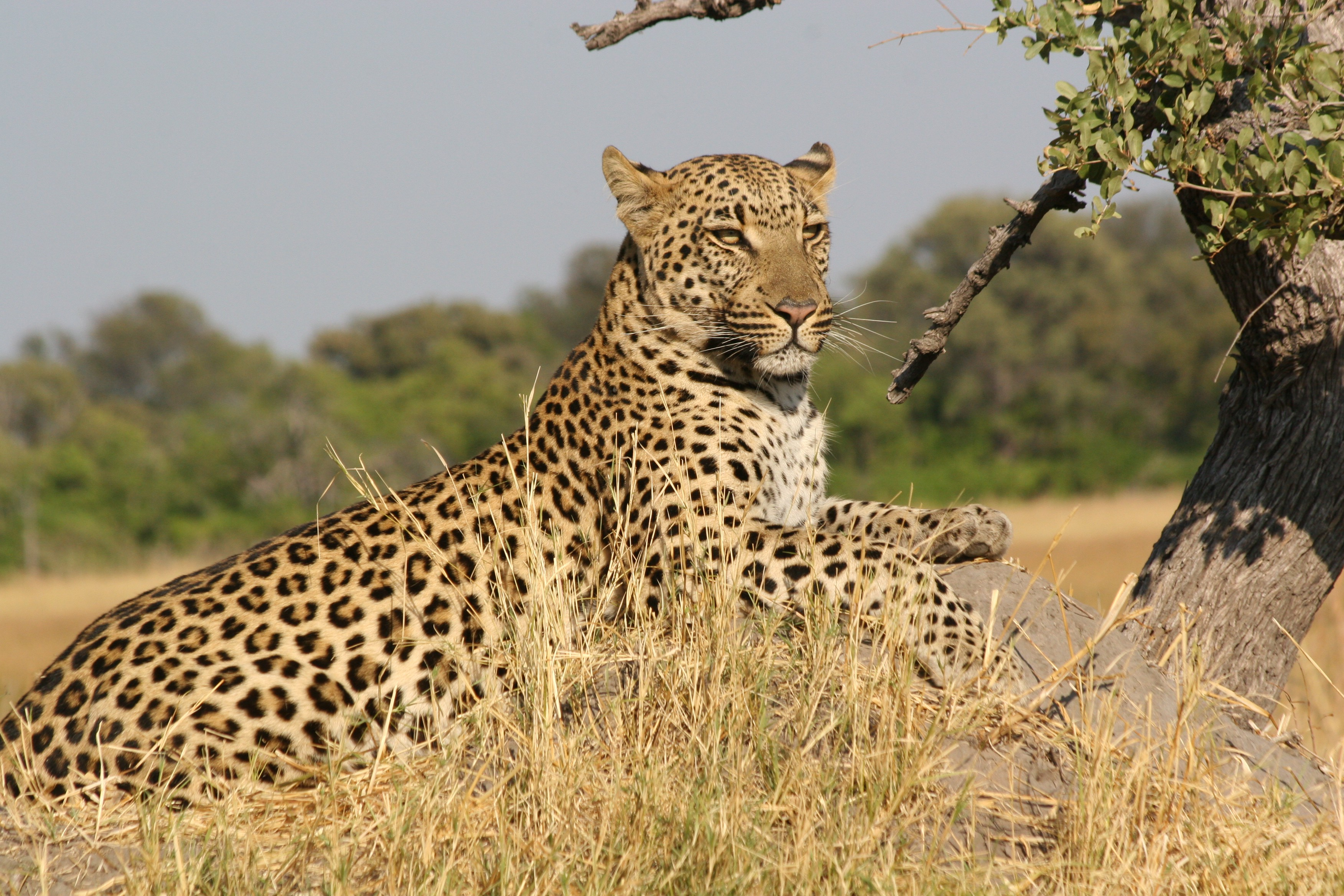
African leopard

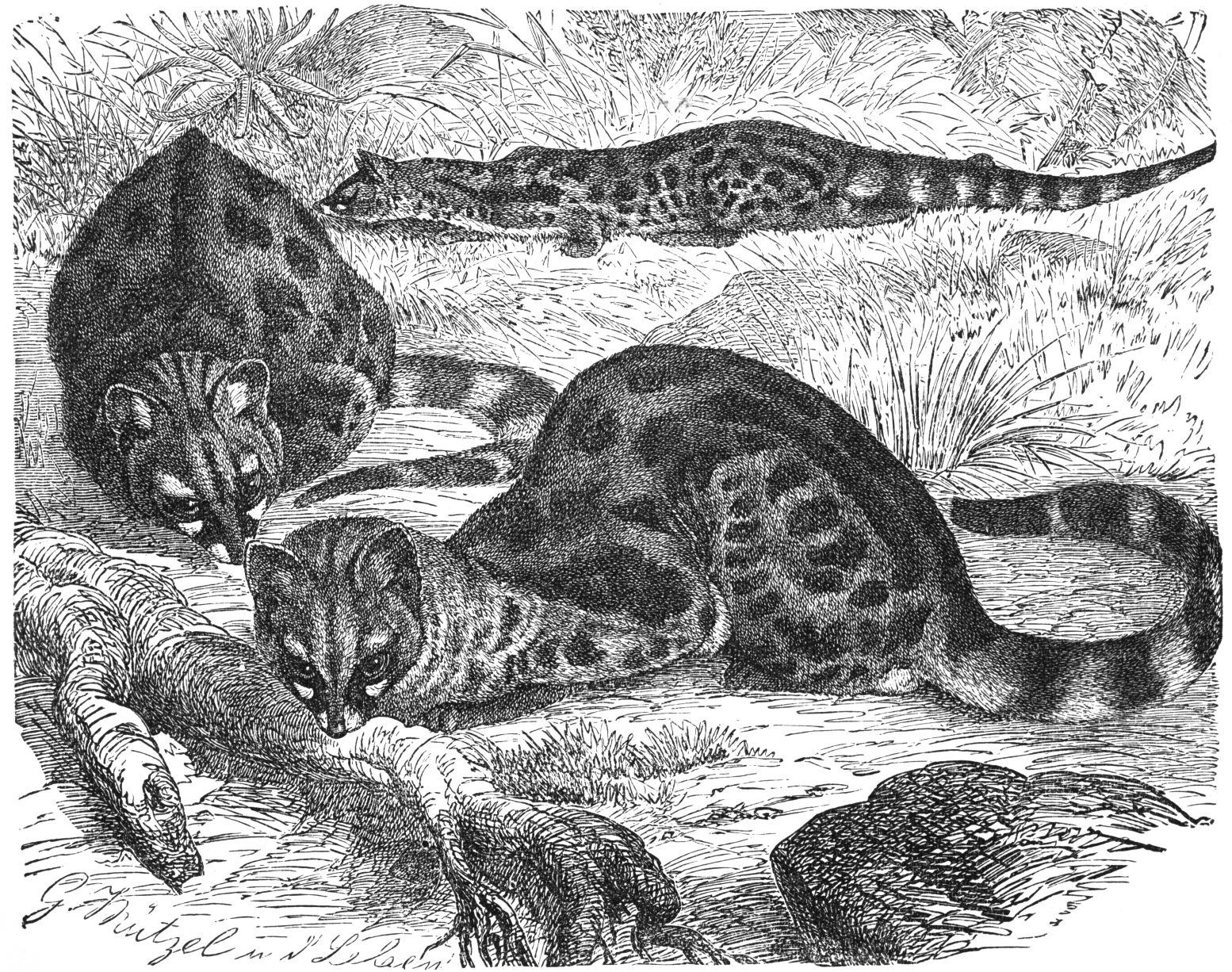
Common genet

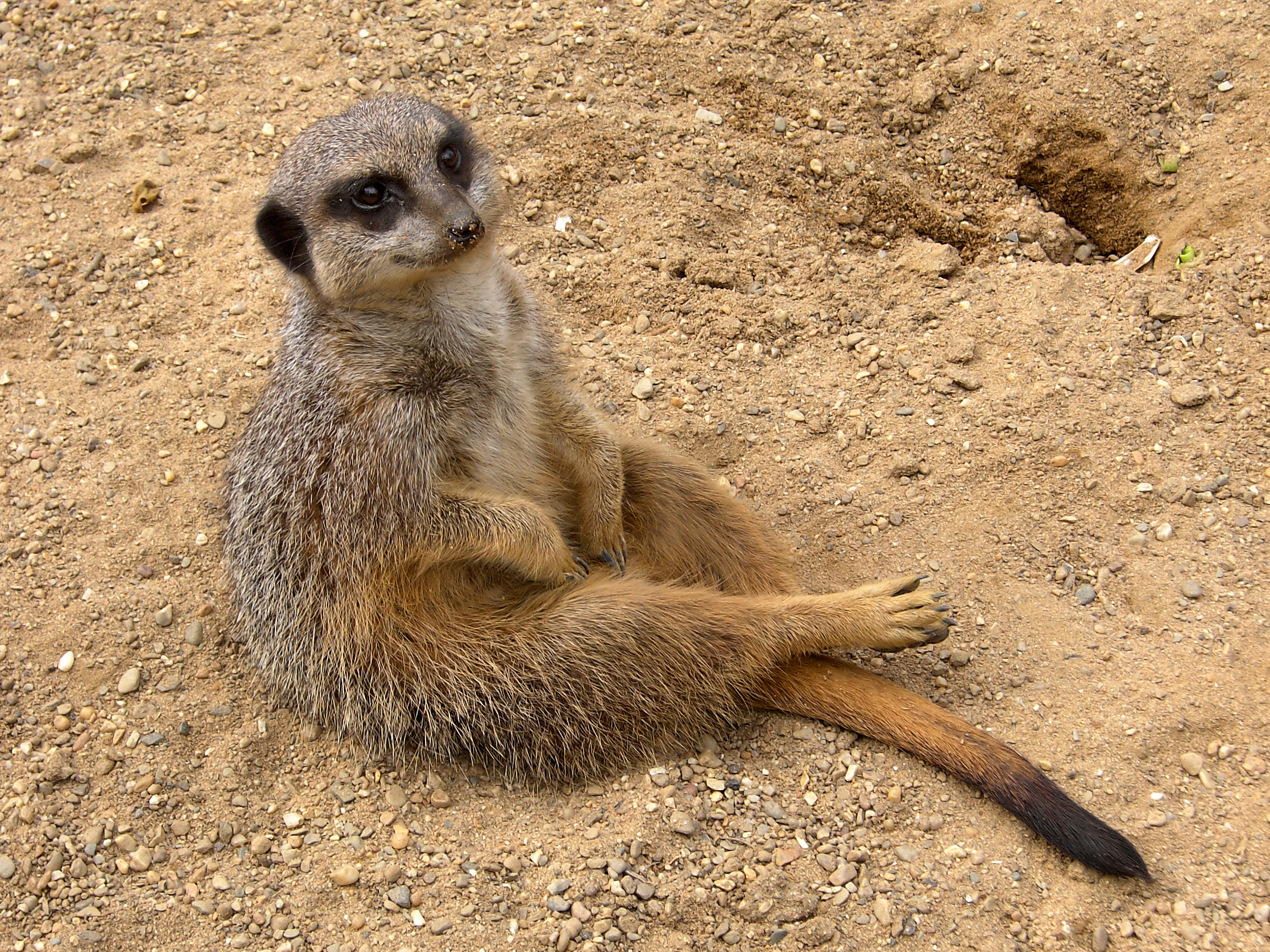
Meerkat

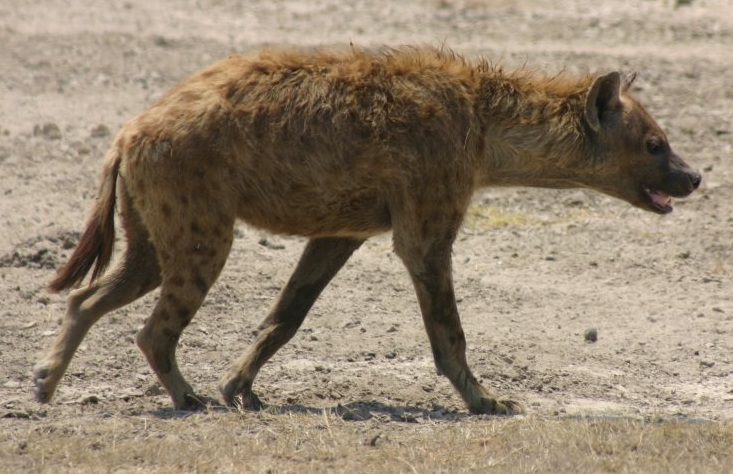
Spotted hyena

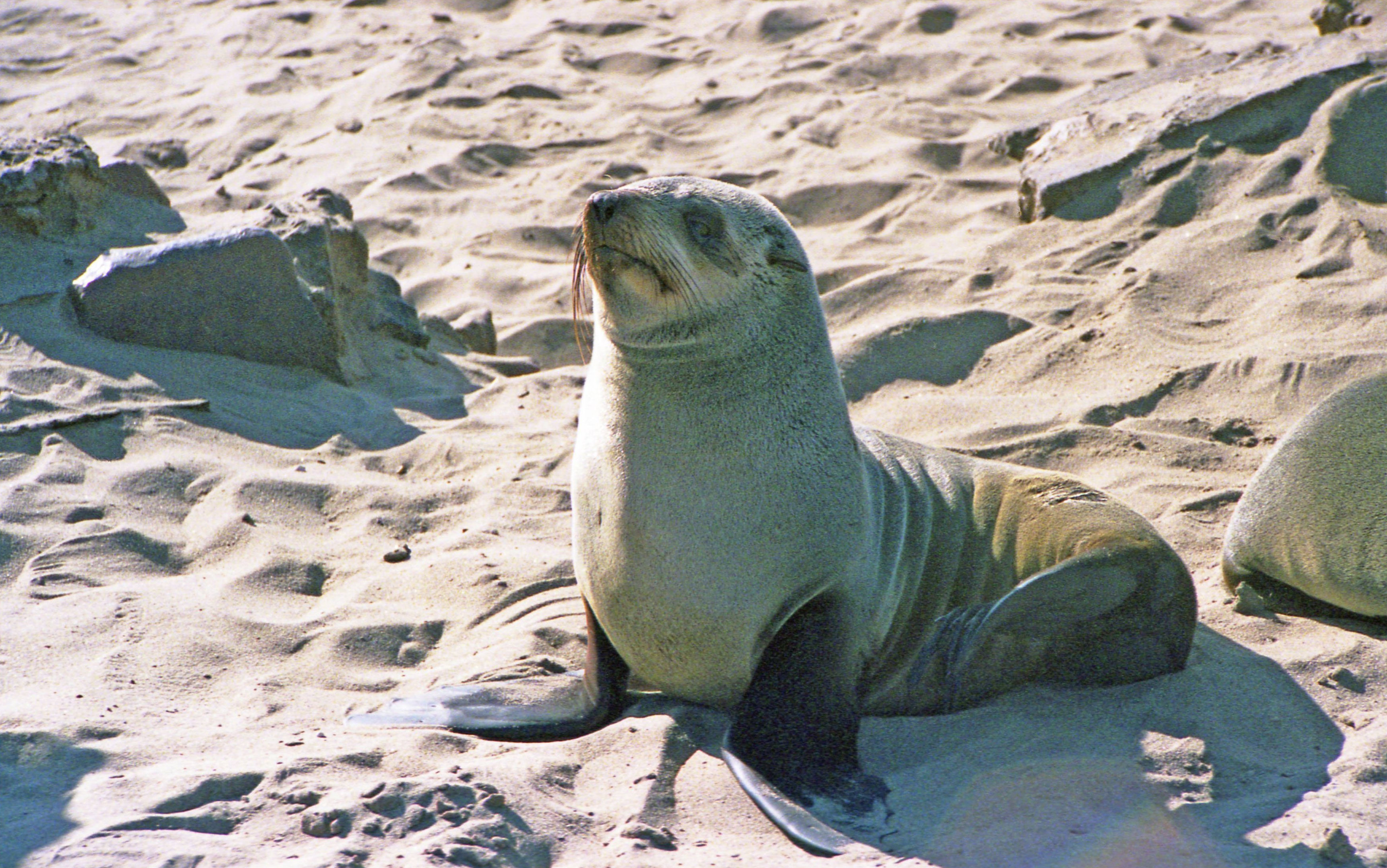
Cape fur seal

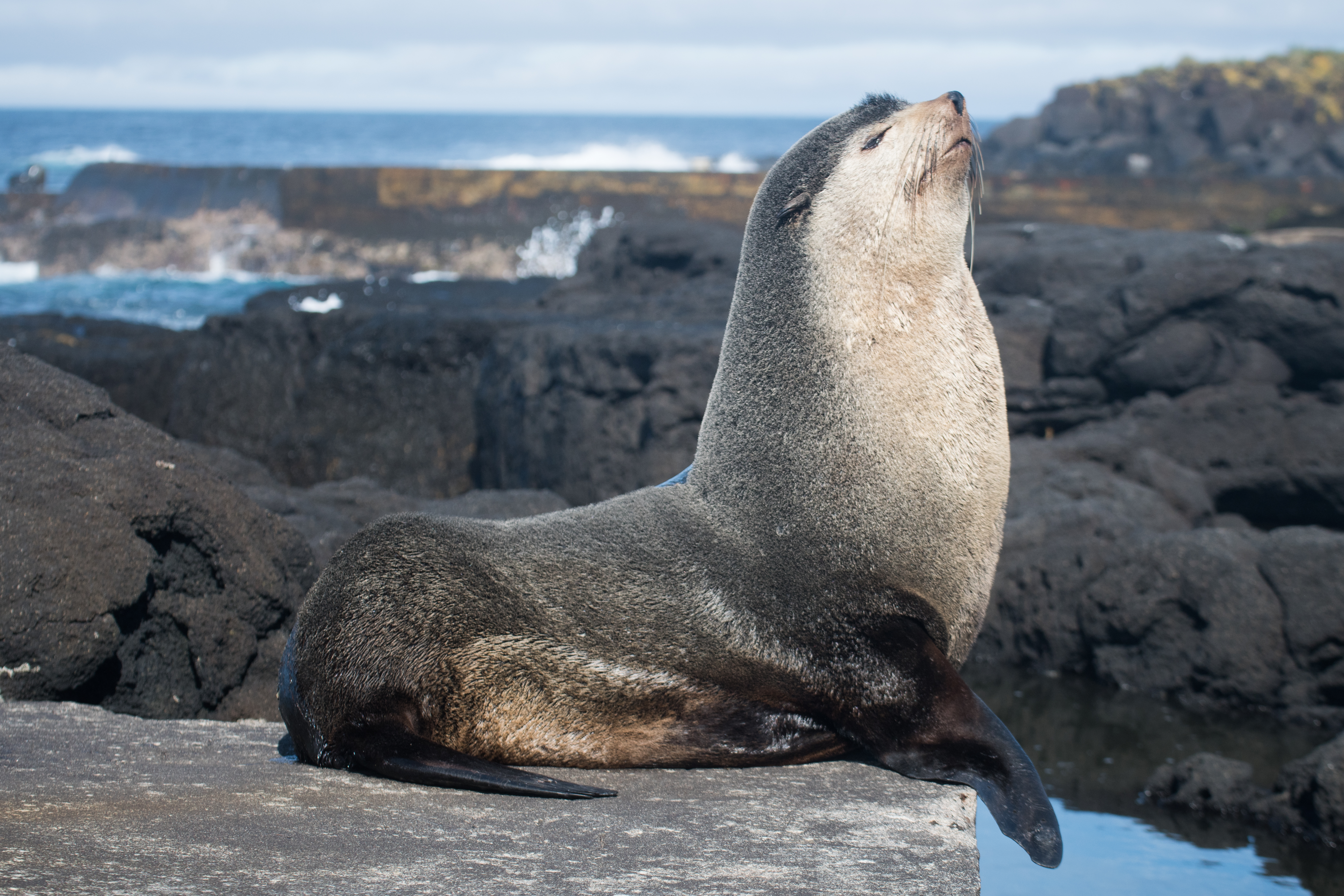
Subantarctic fur seal

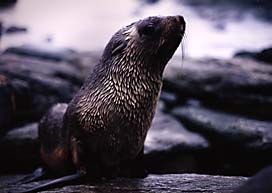
Antarctic fur seal

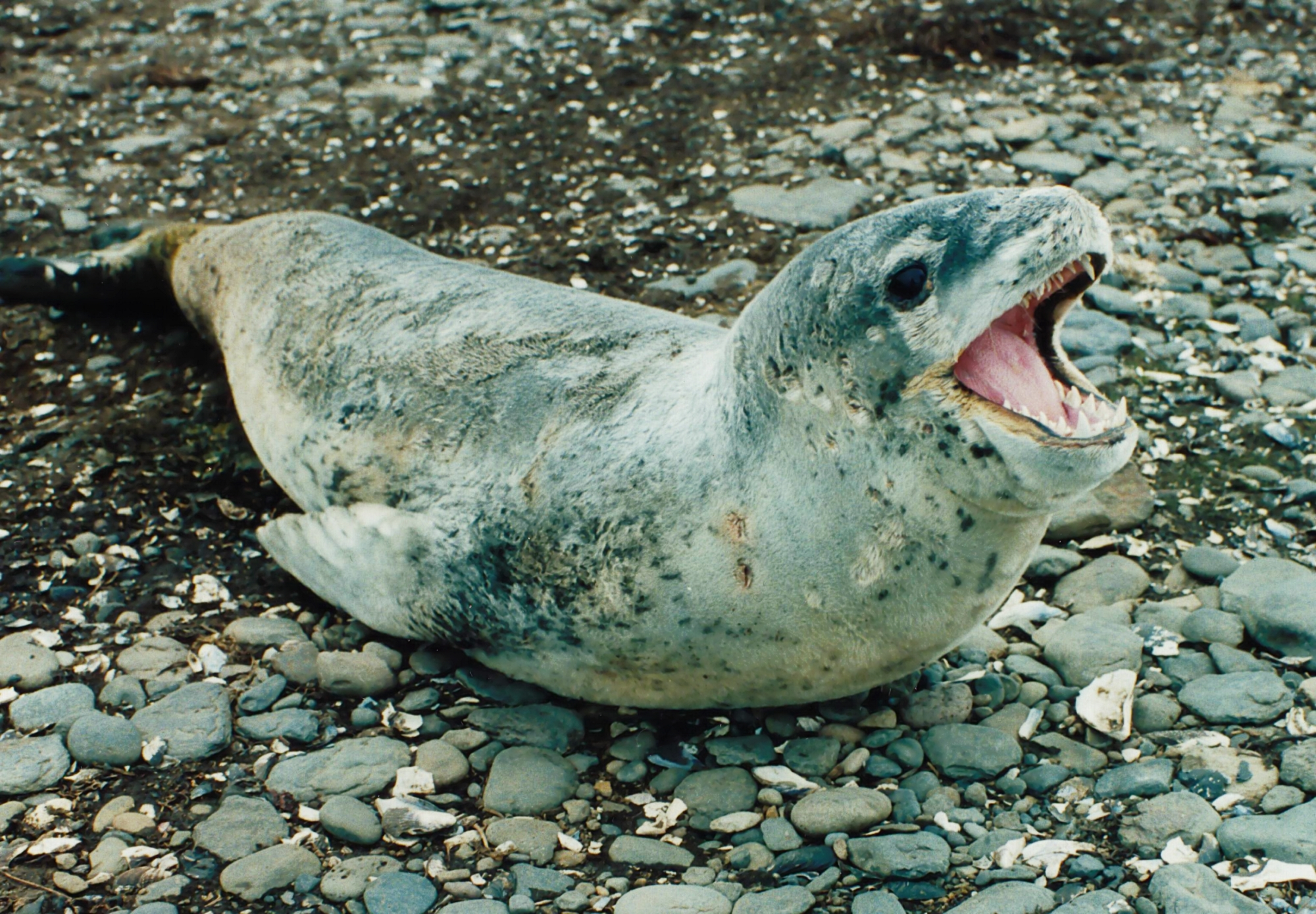
Leopard seal

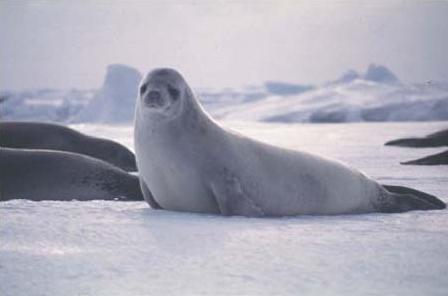
Crabeater seal

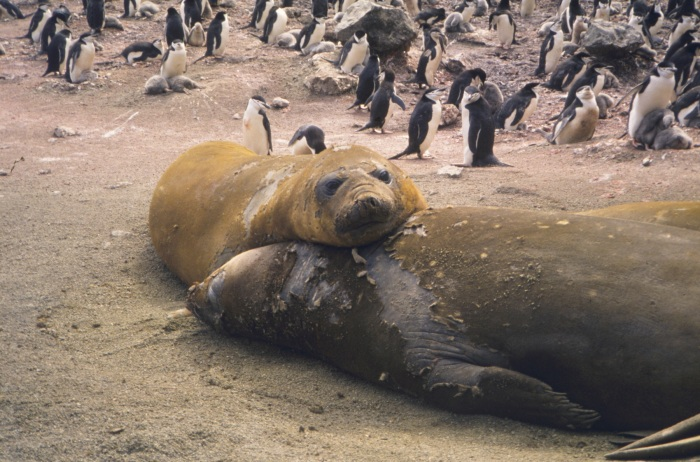
Southern elephant seal

There are over 260 species of carnivorans, the majority of which feed primarily on meat. They have a characteristic skull shape and dentition.

- Suborder: Feliformia
  - Family: Felidae
    - Subfamily: Pantherinae
      - Genus: Panthera
        - Lion, Panthera leo VU
          - P. l. melanochaita
        - Leopard, Panthera pardus VU
          - African leopard, Panthera panthera pardus
    - Subfamily: Felinae
      - Genus: Acinonyx
        - Cheetah, Acinonyx jubatus VU
          - Southeast African cheetah, A. j. jubatus
      - Genus: Caracal
        - Caracal, Caracal caracal LC
      - Genus: Leptailurus
        - Serval, Leptailurus serval LC
      - Genus: Felis
        - Black-footed cat, Felis nigripes VU
        - African wildcat, Felis lybica LC
  - Family: Viverridae
    - Subfamily: Viverrinae
      - Genus: Civettictis
        - African civet, Civettictis civetta LC
      - Genus: Genetta
        - Common genet, Genetta genetta LC
        - Rusty-spotted genet, Genetta maculata LC
        - Cape genet, Genetta tigrina LC
  - Family: Herpestidae (mongooses)
    - Genus: Atilax
      - Marsh mongoose, Atilax paludinosus LC
    - Genus: Cynictis
      - Yellow mongoose, Cynictis penicillata LC
    - Genus: Helogale
      - Common dwarf mongoose, Helogale parvula LC
    - Genus: Herpestes
      - Egyptian mongoose, Herpestes ichneumon LC
      - Cape grey mongoose, Herpestes pulverulentus LC
      - Common slender mongoose, Herpestes sanguineus LC
    - Genus: Ichneumia
      - White-tailed mongoose, Ichneumia albicauda LC
    - Genus: Mungos
      - Banded mongoose, Mungos mungo LC
    - Genus: Paracynictis
      - Selous' mongoose, Paracynictis selousi LC
    - Genus: Rhynchogale
      - Meller's mongoose, Rhynchogale melleri LC
    - Genus: Suricata
      - Meerkat, Suricata suricatta LC
  - Family: Hyaenidae (hyaenas)
    - Genus: Crocuta
      - Spotted hyena, Crocuta crocuta LC
    - Genus: Parahyaena
      - Brown hyena, Parahyaena brunnea NT
    - Genus: Proteles
      - Aardwolf, Proteles cristatus LC
- Suborder: Caniformia
  - Family: Canidae (dogs, foxes)
    - Genus: Vulpes
      - Cape fox, Vulpes chama LC
    - Genus: Lupulella
      - Side-striped jackal, Lupulella adusta LC
      - Black-backed jackal, Lupulella mesomelas LC
    - Genus: Otocyon
      - Bat-eared fox, Otocyon megalotis LC
    - Genus: Lycaon
      - African wild dog, Lycaon pictus EN
  - Family: Mustelidae (mustelids)
    - Genus: Ictonyx
      - Striped polecat, Ictonyx striatus LC
    - Genus: Poecilogale
      - African striped weasel, Poecilogale albinucha LC
    - Genus: Mellivora
      - Honey badger, Mellivora capensis LC
    - Genus: Hydrictis
      - Speckle-throated otter, Hydrictis maculicollis LC
    - Genus: Aonyx
      - African clawless otter, Aonyx capensis LC
  - Family: Otariidae (eared seals, sealions)
    - Genus: Arctocephalus
      - Cape fur seal, Arctocephalus pusillus LC
      - Antarctic fur seal, Arctocephalus gazella LC
      - Subantarctic fur seal, Arctocephalus tropicalis LC
  - Family: Phocidae (earless seals)
    - Genus: Hydrurga
      - Leopard seal, Hydrurga leptonyx LC
    - Genus: Leptonychotes
      - Weddell seal, Leptonychotes weddellii LC
    - Genus: Lobodon
      - Crabeater seal, Lobodon carcinophagus LC
    - Genus: Mirounga
      - Southern elephant seal, Mirounga leonina LC

== Order: Perissodactyla (odd-toed ungulates) ==
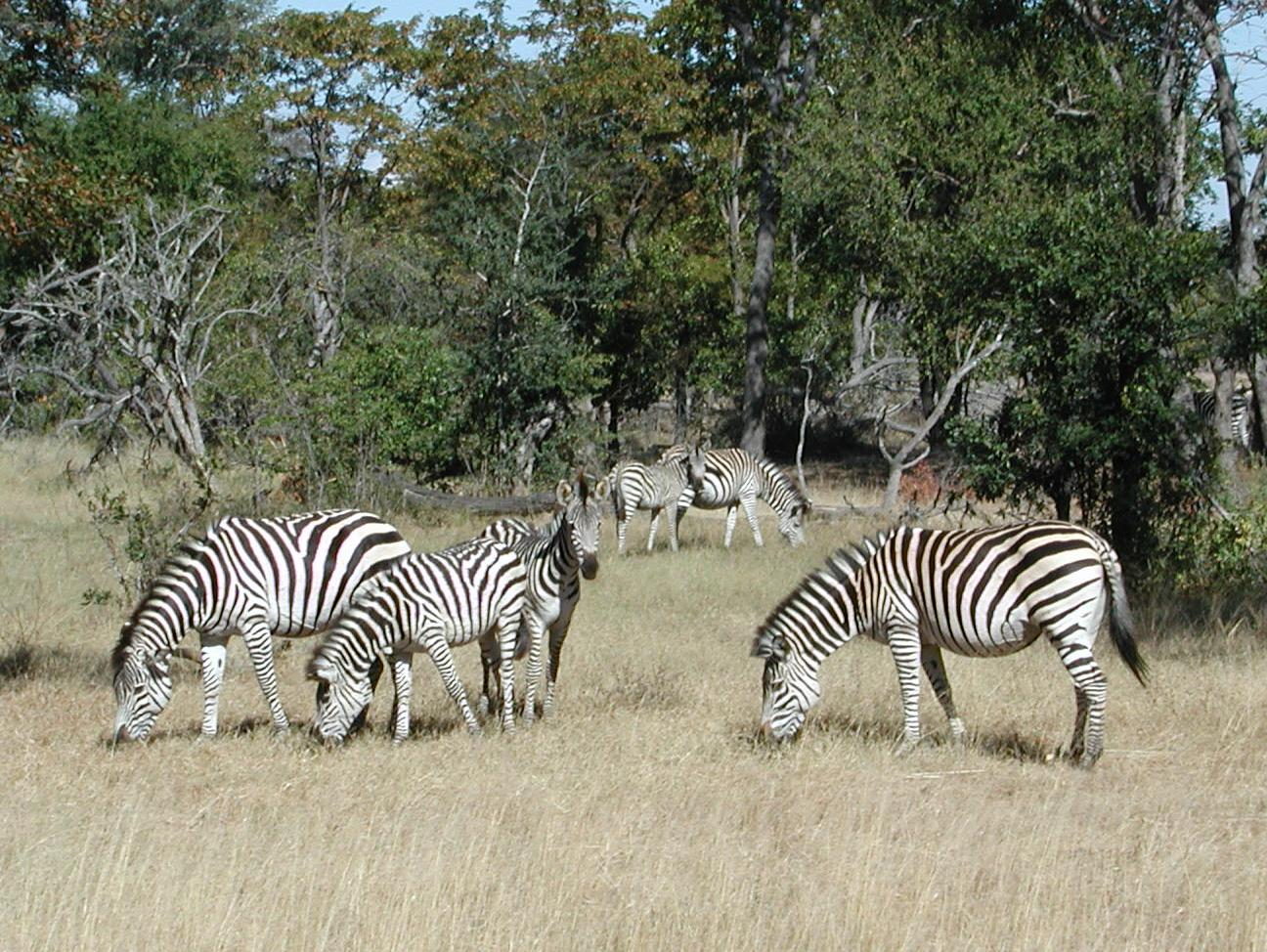
Plains zebra

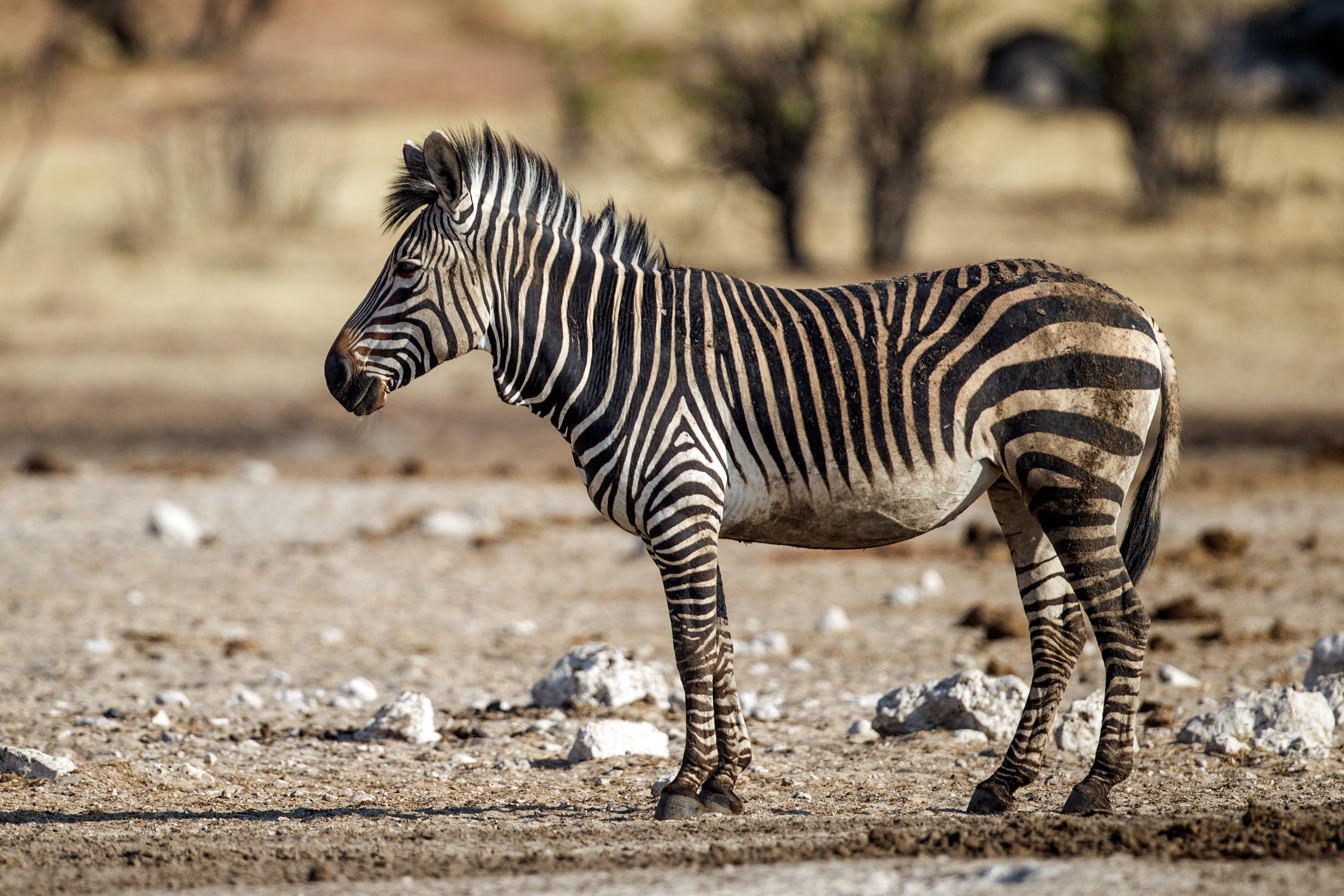
Mountain zebra

The odd-toed ungulates are browsing and grazing mammals. They are usually large to very large, and have relatively simple stomachs and a large middle toe.

- Family: Equidae (horses etc.)
  - Genus: Equus
    - Plains zebra, Equus quagga NT
      - Burchell's zebra, E. q. burchellii
      - Chapman's zebra, E. q. chapmani
      - Quagga, E. q. quagga EX
    - Mountain zebra, Equus zebra VU
      - Cape mountain zebra, E. z. zebra
- Family: Rhinocerotidae
  - Genus: Ceratotherium
    - White rhinoceros, Ceratotherium simum. NT
      - Southern white rhinoceros, C. s. simum NT
  - Genus: Diceros
    - Black rhinoceros, Diceros bicornis CR
      - Eastern black rhinoceros, D. b. bicornis CR
      - South-central black rhinoceros, D. b. minor CR
      - South-western black rhinoceros, D. b. occidentalis NT

== Order: Artiodactyla (even-toed ungulates) ==
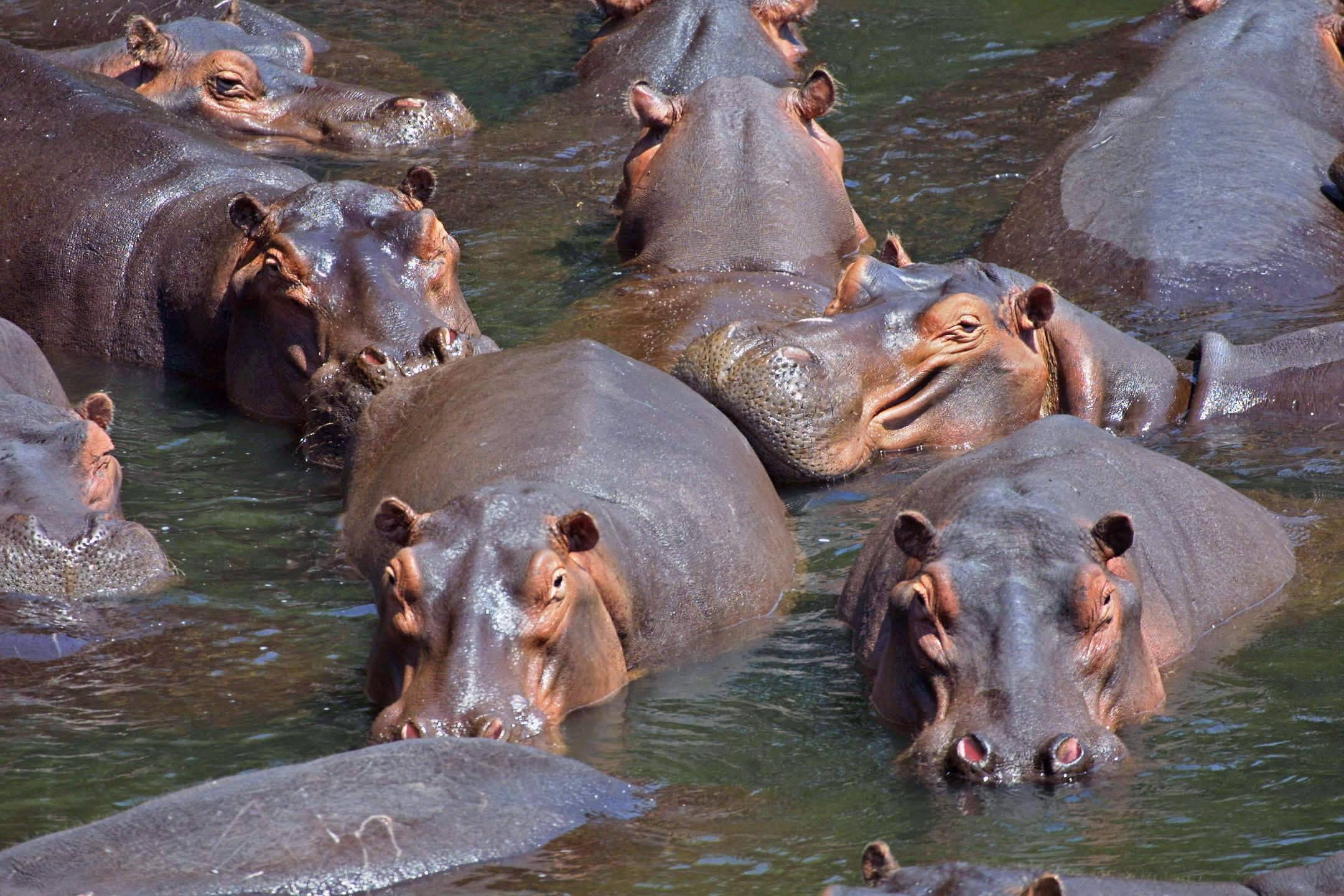
Hippopotamus

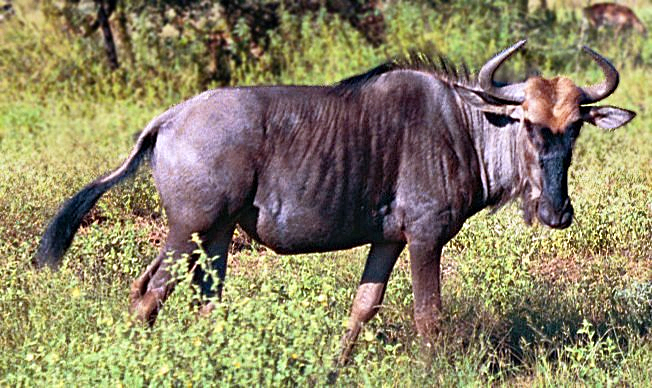
Blue wildebeest

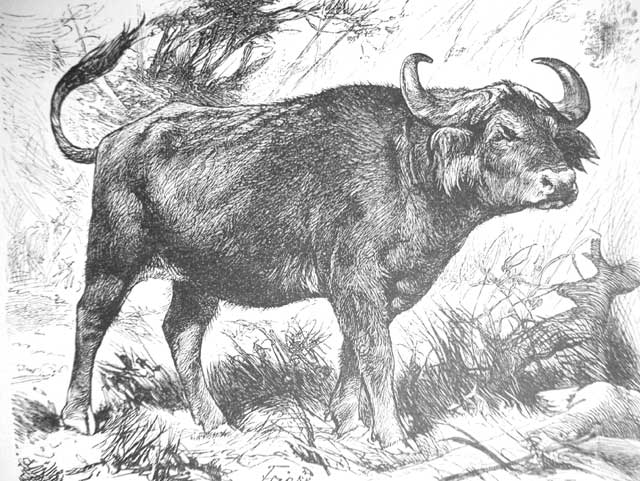
African buffalo

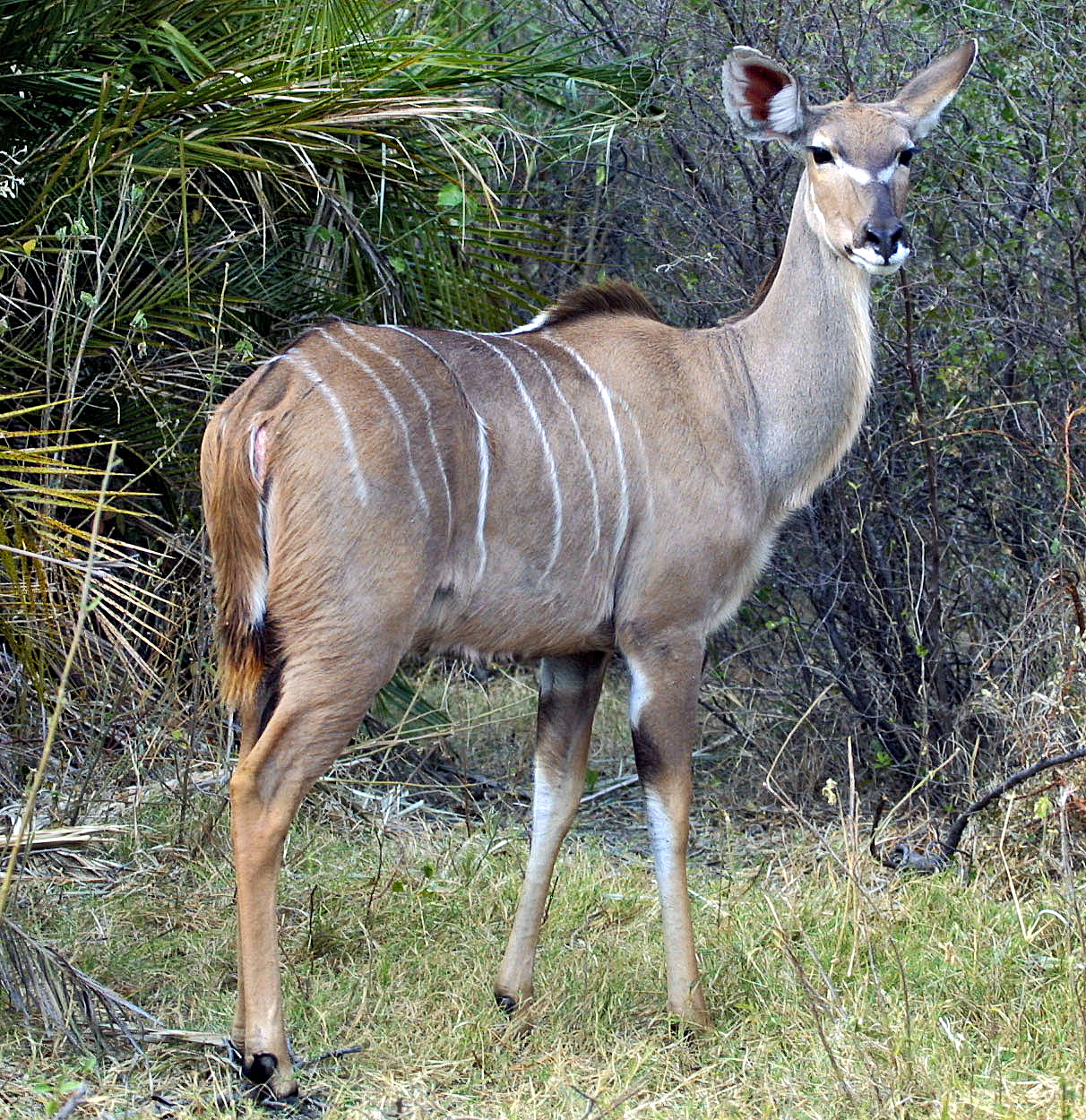
Greater kudu

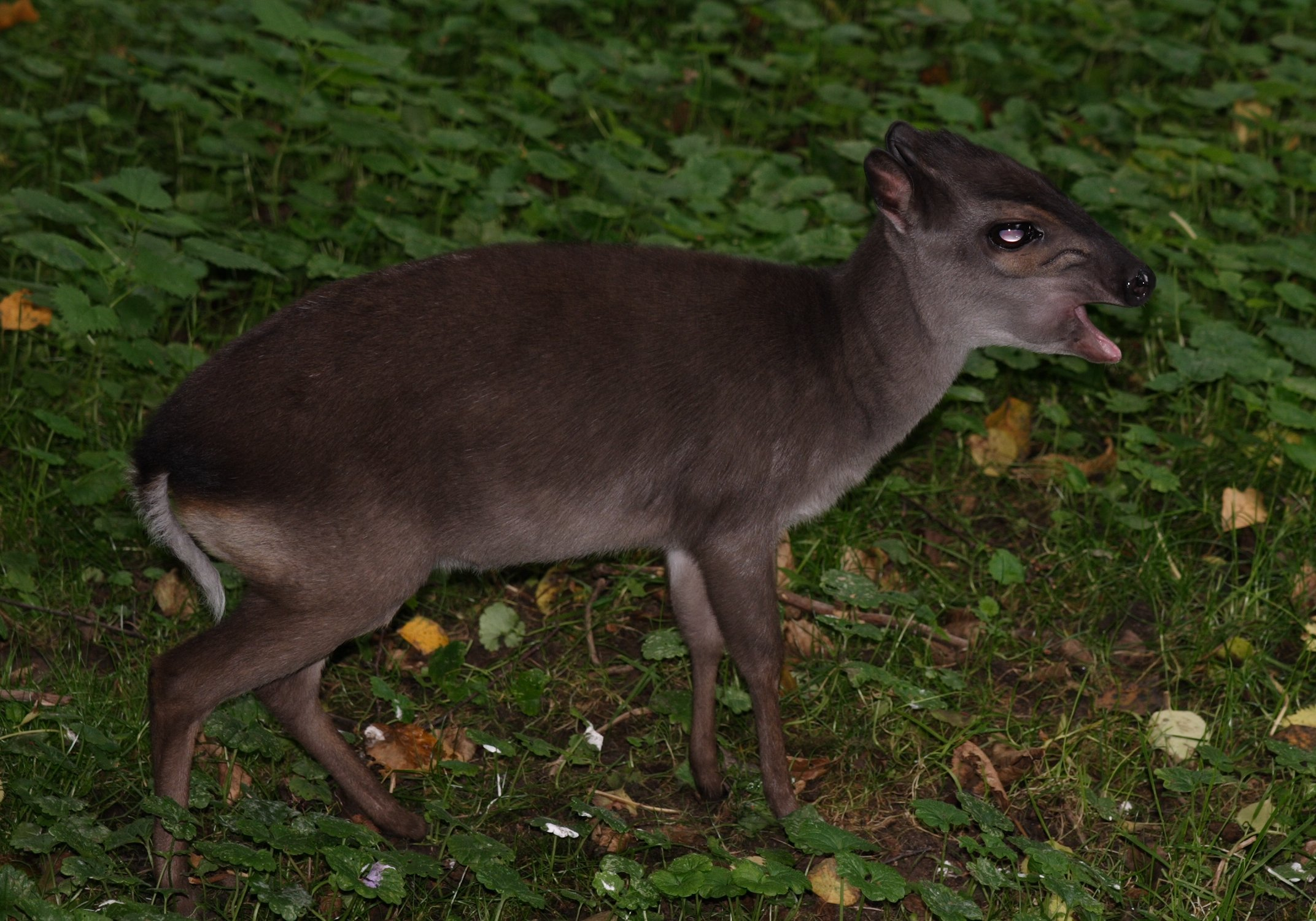
Blue duiker

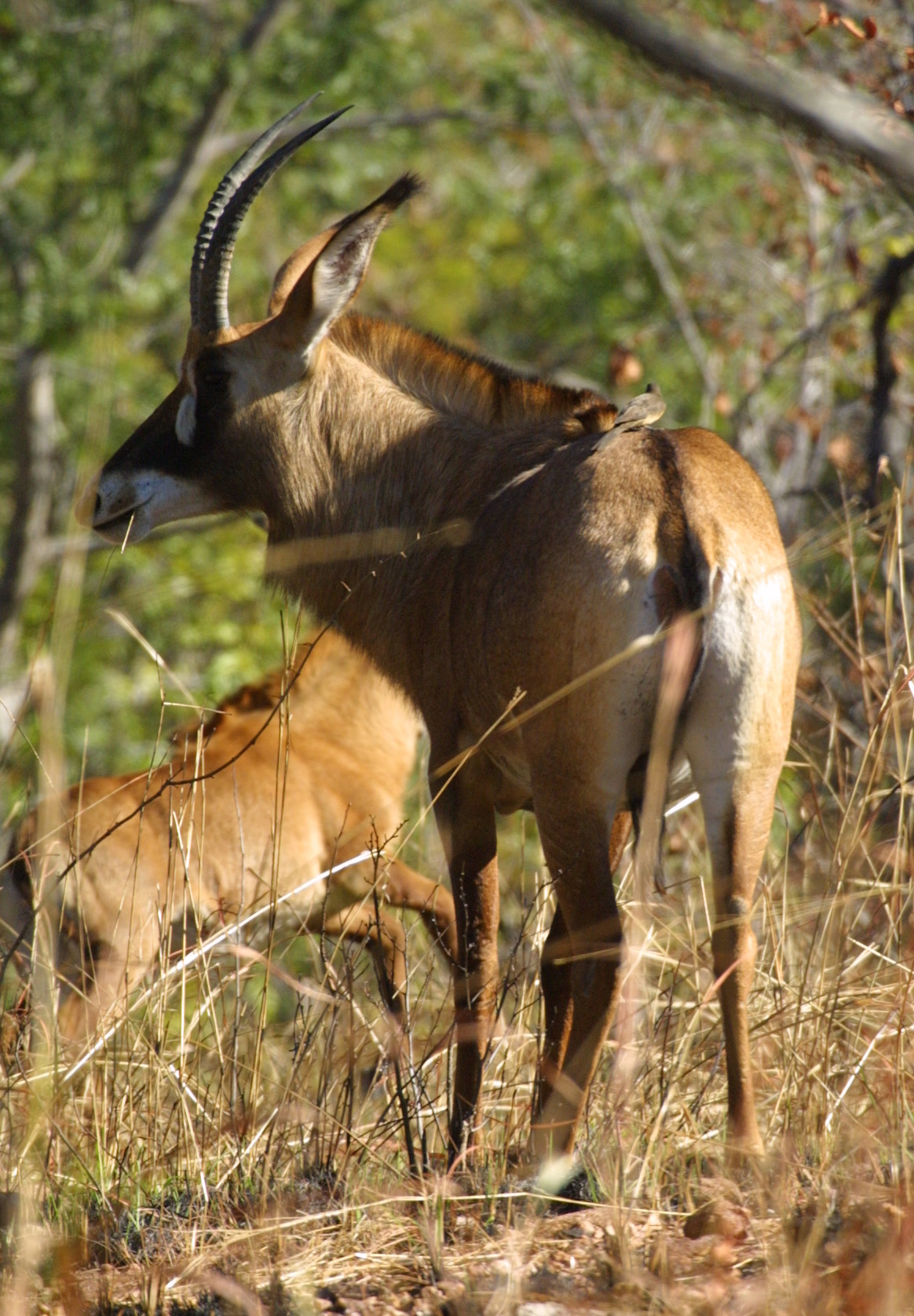
Roan antelope

The even-toed ungulates are ungulates whose weight is borne about equally by the third and fourth toes, rather than mostly or entirely by the third as in perissodactyls. There are about 220 artiodactyl species, including many that are of great economic importance to humans.

- Family: Cervidae (deer)
  - Subfamily: Cervinae
    - Genus: Dama
      - European fallow deer, Dama dama LC introduced
- Family: Suidae (pigs)
  - Subfamily: Phacochoerinae
    - Genus: Phacochoerus
      - Desert warthog, Phacochoerus aethiopicus LC extirpated
        - Cape warthog, P. a. aethiopicus EX
      - Common warthog, Phacochoerus africanus LC
  - Subfamily: Suinae
    - Genus: Potamochoerus
      - Bushpig, Potamochoerus larvatus LR/lc
- Family: Hippopotamidae (hippopotamuses)
  - Genus: Hippopotamus
    - Hippopotamus, Hippopotamus amphibius VU
- Family: Giraffidae (giraffe, okapi)
  - Genus: Giraffa
    - Giraffe, Giraffa camelopardalis VU
      - South African giraffe (G. c. giraffa) VU
- Family: Bovidae (cattle, antelope, sheep, goats)
  - Subfamily: Alcelaphinae
    - Genus: Alcelaphus
      - Hartebeest Alcelaphus buselaphus LC
        - Red hartebeest, Alcelaphus buselaphus caama LR/cd
        - Lichtenstein's hartebeest, Alcelaphus buselaphus lichtensteinii LR/cd
    - Genus: Connochaetes
      - Black wildebeest, Connochaetes gnou LC
      - Blue wildebeest, Connochaetes taurinus LR/cd
    - Genus: Damaliscus
      - Bontebok, Damaliscus pygargus LR/cd
      - Common tsessebe, Damalicus lunatus lunatus LR/cd
  - Subfamily: Antilopinae
    - Genus: Antidorcas
      - Springbok antelope, Antidorcas marsupialis LR/cd
    - Genus: Neotragus
      - Suni, Neotragus moschatus LR/cd
    - Genus: Oreotragus
      - Klipspringer, Oreotragus oreotragus LR/cd
    - Genus: Ourebia
      - Oribi, Ourebia ourebi LR/cd
    - Genus: Raphicerus
      - Steenbok, Raphicerus campestris LR/lc
      - Cape grysbok, Raphicerus melanotis LR/cd
      - Sharpe's grysbok, Raphicerus sharpei LR/cd
  - Subfamily: Bovinae
    - Genus: Syncerus
      - African buffalo, Syncerus caffer LR/cd
    - Genus: Tragelaphus
      - Nyala, Tragelaphus angasii LR/cd
      - Common eland, Tragelaphus oryx LR/cd
      - Bushbuck, Tragelaphus scriptus LR/lc
      - Greater kudu, Tragelaphus strepsiceros LR/cd
  - Subfamily: Cephalophinae
    - Genus: Cephalophus
      - Blue duiker, Cephalophus monticola LR/lc
      - Red forest duiker, Cephalophus natalensis LR/cd
    - Genus: Sylvicapra
      - Common duiker, Sylvicapra grimmia LR/lc
  - Subfamily: Hippotraginae
    - Genus: Hippotragus
      - Roan antelope, Hippotragus equinus LR/cd
      - Bluebuck, Hippotragus leucophaeus EX
      - Sable antelope, Hippotragus niger LR/cd
    - Genus: Oryx
      - Gemsbok, Oryx gazella LR/cd
  - Subfamily: Peleinae
    - Genus: Pelea
      - Grey rhebok, Pelea capreolus LC
  - Subfamily: Aepycerotinae
    - Genus: Aepyceros
      - Impala, Aepyceros melampus LR/cd
  - Subfamily: Reduncinae
    - Genus: Kobus
      - Waterbuck, Kobus ellipsiprymnus LR/cd
    - Genus: Redunca
      - Southern reedbuck, Redunca arundinum LC
      - Mountain reedbuck, Redunca fulvorufula LC

== See also ==
- List of chordate orders
- Lists of mammals by region
- List of prehistoric mammals
- Mammal classification – Taxonomy of mammals
- List of mammals described in the 2000s
