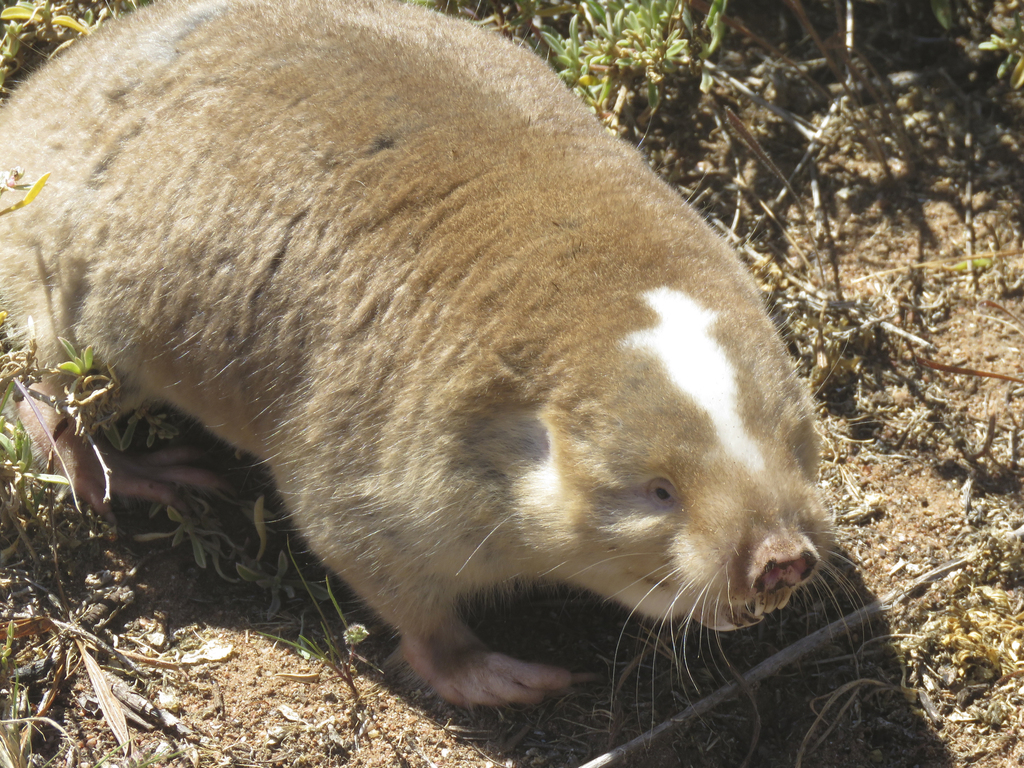

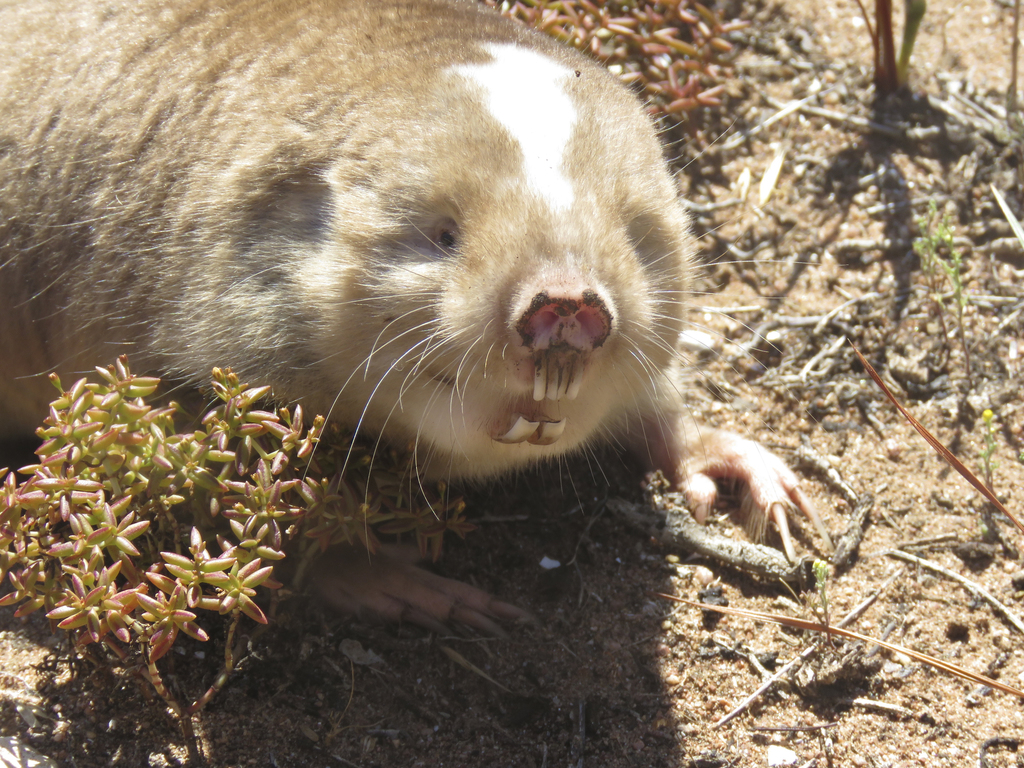

Conservation status
- Least Concern (IUCN 3.1)

Scientific classification
- Kingdom: Animalia
- Phylum: Chordata
- Class: Mammalia
- Infraclass: Placentalia
- Order: Rodentia
- Family: Bathyergidae
- Genus: Bathyergus
- Species: B. suillus

Binomial name
- Bathyergus suillus (Schreber, 1782)
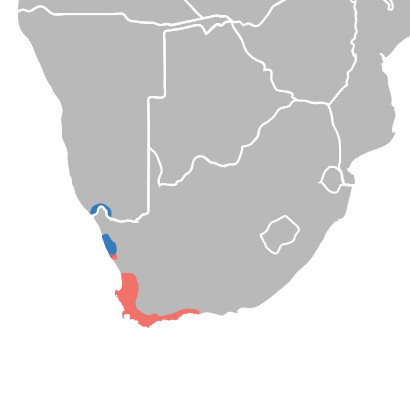
- Bathyergus distribution B. suillus in red

= Cape dune mole-rat =

Species of rodent

The Cape dune mole-rat (Bathyergus suillus) is a species of solitary burrowing rodent in the family Bathyergidae. It is endemic to South Africa and named for the Cape of Good Hope.

== Description ==
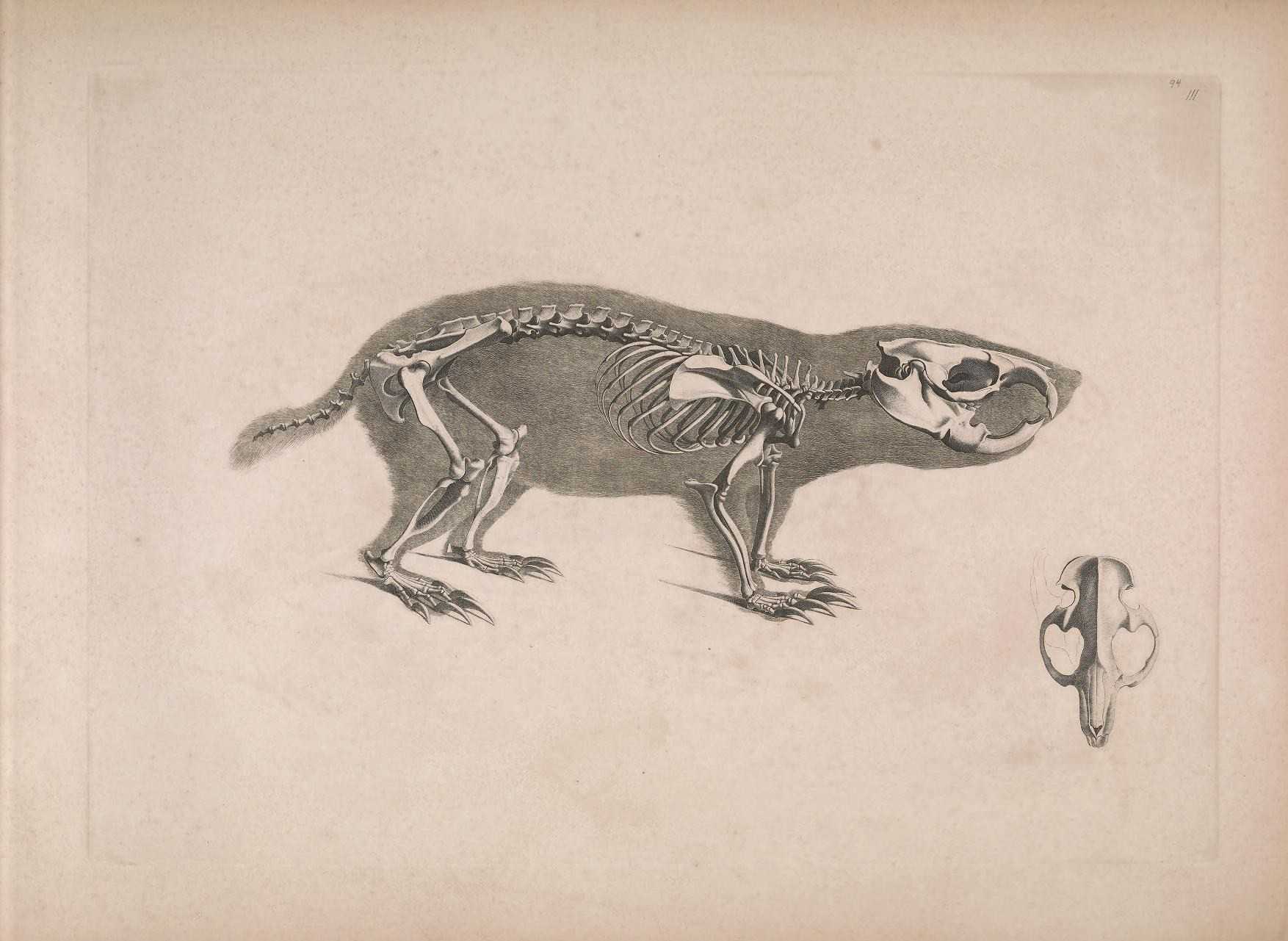
Skeleton.

The Cape dune mole-rat is the largest of all the blesmols, measuring 27 to 35 centimetres (11 to 14 in) in head-body length, with a short, 3 to 4 centimetres (1.2 to 1.6 in) tail. Males are generally much heavier than females, weighing anything from 570 to 1,350 grams (20 to 48 oz), compared with typical female weights of 590 to 970 grams (21 to 34 oz).

Both sexes are sturdy, large-bodied rodents, with blunt snouts, cylindrical torsos and short limbs. The forefeet are heavily adapted for digging, with powerful curved claws. To enable to move more quickly through tight tunnels, the body has few visible external features; for example, there are no pinnae or scrotum, and the penis retracts into a concealed sheath. Lip-like flaps of skin are able to close behind the incisors, preventing soil from falling into the mouth. The eyes are small, but not permanently closed.

Unlike its relative the naked mole-rat, the Cape dune species has a thick pelt of soft fur over its entire body. It is cinnamon-brown with greyish underparts, and few, if any markings. Like other blesmols, the Cape dune mole rat has a relatively low body temperature for its size, of about 35 °C (95 °F), and is not able to tolerate cold weather above ground.

== Distribution and habitat ==
The Cape dune mole-rat is found only in South Africa, where it is found along the southern and western shores roughly between Vanrhynsdorp and Port Elizabeth. Its natural habitat is sandy shorelines and river banks dominated by veldt grassland, sedges, and herbs.

== Diet and behaviour ==
Digging

Like all mole-rats, this species is strictly herbivorous. Their diet consists largely of grass and sedges pulled down into the burrow by the roots, although they also eat bulbs and tubers from local plants such as Albuca and cape tulips. Since they almost never travel above ground, they are neither clearly nocturnal or diurnal, and may be active at any time of the day, although their peak activity seems to be during the afternoon.

Unusually for a blesmol, the Cape dune mole-rat is not a social animal, with each individual having its own, isolated, burrow system. While most other blesmols dig through soil using their large, chiselling incisor teeth, the loose, sandy soil of their native environment makes this approach less effective for Cape dune mole-rats, which instead dig primarily with their claws, kicking the sand behind their bodies and eventually pushing it up to the surface as a molehill. The burrows are entirely sealed, with no access to the surface, and stretch for between 50 and 420 metres (160 and 1,380 ft), over an area of around 0.27 hectares (0.67 acres). A single mole rat has been estimated to be able to excavate up to 500 kilograms (1,100 lb) of soil in a month, under ideal conditions.

Such burrows consist of numerous tunnels that the mole rat uses to search for food, and a few, deeper chambers used for nesting, food storage, and as latrines. Most tunnels are between 35 and 65 centimetres (14 and 26 in) below ground, but there are often a few blind-ending passages running as deep as 2 metres (6 ft 7 in), into which the animal retreats to escape from mole snakes and other predators, blocking the tunnel behind itself as it does so. The burrows are protected from extremes of weather, and are constantly humid and hypoxic.

The breeding season lasts from April to November, when rain is plentiful. Receptive individuals initially signal to each other by drumming on the floors of their burrows with their hind legs. After they have approached other, they lock their large incisor teeth together, until the female raises her tail and calls out prior to copulation.

Gestation lasts for about two months, and results in the birth of a litter of up to six young, with three being typical. The young are initially blind and weigh 27 to 52 grams (0.95 to 1.83 oz). They open their eyes at seven days, begin to take solid food at twelve days, and are fully weaned by the end of their first month. Litter mates frequently spar with one another, and disperse to establish their own burrow systems after around two months, by which time they have already reached nearly half the adult body weight. They live for over six years.

== Taxonomy and naming ==
The German physician and naturalist Johann von Schreber was the first to describe the Cape dune mole-rat in 1782 and gave it the scientific name Mus suillus, but this name was apparently unknown to later colleagues. In 1788 the species was described again, both by the also German Johann Friedrich Gmelin, who called it Mus maritimus, and by the Swedish naturalist and Cape explorer Carl Peter Thunberg, who gave it the name Marmota africana. The Scotsman Andrew Smith classified the species, as described by Gmelin, with the genus Georychus, making the new combination G. maritimus. In 1829 the French naturalist Georges Cuvier relocated the species again and created the new combination Orycterus maritimus. In 1832 Johanne Smuts classified the species with the genus Bathyergus, but again with the species name maritimus. It wasn't until 1926, when Austin Roberts realized that Von Schreber's name was the first and that the correct combination is therefore Bathyergus suillus. There are currently no recognised subspecies of Cape dune mole-rat, although there have been few detailed studies of their genetic variability. It is possible that the species can hybridise with the Namaqua dune mole-rat, with some suspected hybrids having been recovered from the Groenrivier region, where the two species live relatively close together.

The genus name Bathyergus is derived from the Greek and means deep digger. The species name suillus comes from the Latin word sus (pig) and refers to the pig-like nose.

=== Ancestry ===
The Cape dune mole-rat is one of only two living species of the genus Bathyergus, along with the Namaqua dune mole-rat. Both living species may have evolved from Bathyergus hendeyi, an extinct species rather smaller than the extant forms, which inhabited the Cape Province region of South Africa during the early Pliocene, around four million years ago. Because of the large numbers of fossils found together, it has been suggested that this early species was social, like most other blesmols, but unlike its presumed living descendants; however, other possible explanations for this taphonomy exist.
