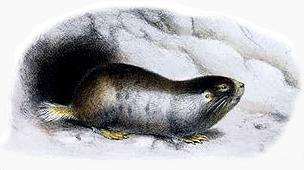
- Bathyergus janetta
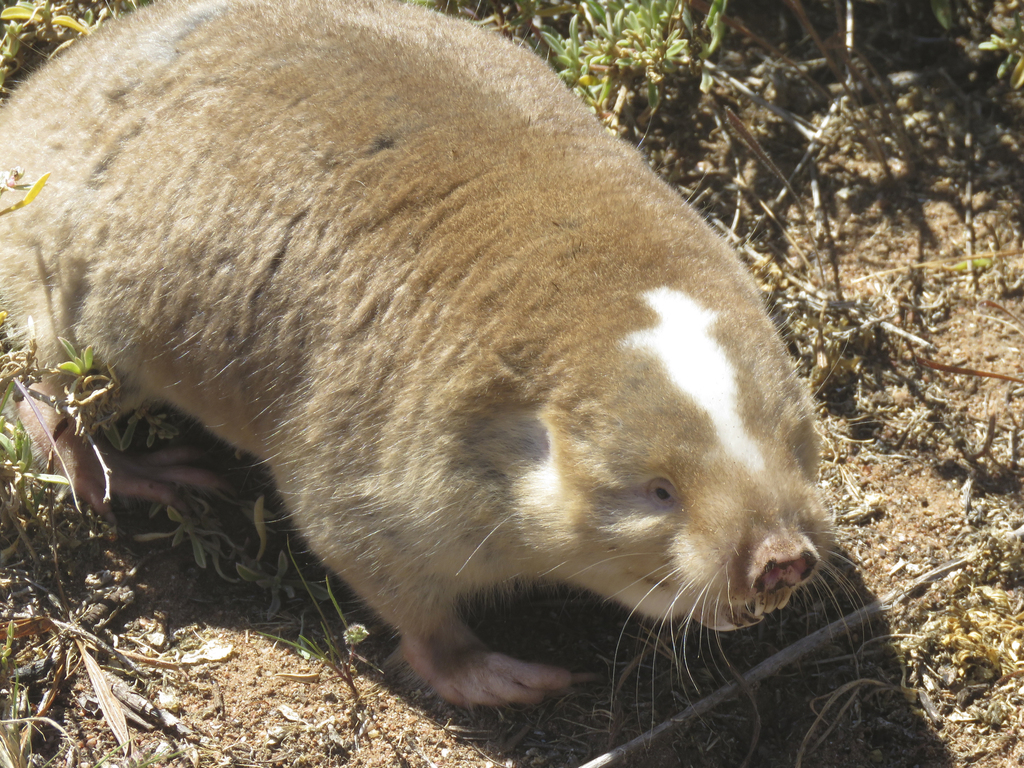
- Bathyergus suillus

Scientific classification
- Kingdom: Animalia
- Phylum: Chordata
- Class: Mammalia
- Infraclass: Placentalia
- Order: Rodentia
- Family: Bathyergidae
- Genus: Bathyergus; Illiger, 1811

Type species
- Mus maritimus Gmelin, 1788

Species
- Bathyergus janetta Bathyergus suillus
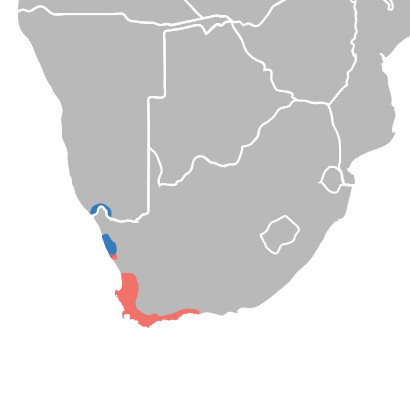
- Bathyergus distribution B. janetta in blue, B. suillus in red

= Bathyergus =

Bathyergus Temporal range: Middle Pleistocene to Recent

Genus of rodents

Bathyergus is the genus of dune mole-rats endemic to South Africa. It contains two species :

- Namaqua dune mole-rat - B. janetta
- Cape dune mole-rat - B. suillus
