= Barbour's rock mouse =

Conservation status
- Least Concern (IUCN 3.1)

Scientific classification
- Kingdom: Animalia
- Phylum: Chordata
- Class: Mammalia
- Order: Rodentia
- Family: Nesomyidae
- Genus: Petromyscus
- Species: P. barbouri

Binomial name
- Petromyscus barbouri Shortridge & Carter, 1938

Species of rodent

Barbour's rock mouse (Petromyscus barbouri) is a species of rodent in the family Nesomyidae. It is found only in South Africa. Its natural habitats are subtropical or tropical dry shrubland and rocky areas. It is threatened by habitat loss.

== Sources ==
- Musser, G. G.; Carleton, M. D. (2005). "Superfamily Muroidea". In Wilson, D. E.; Reeder, D. M. (eds.). Mammal Species of the World: A Taxonomic and Geographic Reference (3rd ed.). Johns Hopkins University Press. pp. 894–1531. ISBN 978-0-8018-8221-0. OCLC 62265494.
