= Petromyscus =

Petromyscus Temporal range: Pliocene - Recent

Scientific classification
- Domain: Eukaryota
- Kingdom: Animalia
- Phylum: Chordata
- Class: Mammalia
- Order: Rodentia
- Family: Nesomyidae
- Subfamily: Petromyscinae; Roberts, 1951
- Genus: Petromyscus; Thomas, 1926

Species
- Petromyscus barbouri Petromyscus collinus Petromyscus monticularis Petromyscus shortridgei

Genus of rodents

Petromyscus is a genus of rodent in the family Nesomyidae. It is so distinct from other rodents that it is placed as the only genus in subfamily Petromyscinae. In previous classifications, Delanymys brooksi has also been placed in the subfamily. They are found in southwestern Africa. These animals have a sharp lower point to their V-shaped infraorbital canal. Their molars are intermediate between the ancestral cricetid style tooth and the dendromurine style tooth.

The genus contains the following species:

- Barbour's rock mouse (Petromyscus barbouri)
- Pygmy rock mouse (Petromyscus collinus)
- Brukkaros pygmy rock mouse (Petromyscus monticularis)
- Shortridge's rock mouse (Petromyscus shortridgei)
