= Brukkaros pygmy rock mouse =

Conservation status
- Least Concern (IUCN 3.1)

Scientific classification
- Domain: Eukaryota
- Kingdom: Animalia
- Phylum: Chordata
- Class: Mammalia
- Order: Rodentia
- Family: Nesomyidae
- Genus: Petromyscus
- Species: P. monticularis

Binomial name
- Petromyscus monticularis (Thomas & Hinton, 1925)

Species of rodent

The Brukkaros pygmy rock mouse (Petromyscus monticularis) is a species of rodent in the family Nesomyidae. It is found in Namibia and South Africa. Its natural habitat is subtropical or tropical dry shrubland.
