= Pygmy rock mouse =

Conservation status
- Least Concern (IUCN 3.1)

Scientific classification
- Kingdom: Animalia
- Phylum: Chordata
- Class: Mammalia
- Infraclass: Placentalia
- Order: Rodentia
- Family: Nesomyidae
- Genus: Petromyscus
- Species: P. collinus

Binomial name
- Petromyscus collinus (Thomas & Hinton, 1925)

Species of rodent

The pygmy rock mouse (Petromyscus collinus) is a species of rodent in the family Nesomyidae. It is found in Angola, Namibia, and South Africa. Its natural habitat is subtropical or tropical dry shrubland. Its fur yellow grey or yellow brown in color, while the lower parts of the body are white. It has long facial whiskers and a pinkish tail. Total length is about 19 cm and its mass is 20g.
