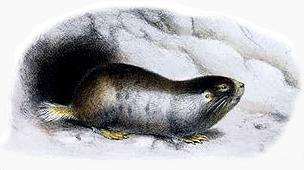

Conservation status
- Least Concern (IUCN 3.1)

Scientific classification
- Kingdom: Animalia
- Phylum: Chordata
- Class: Mammalia
- Order: Rodentia
- Family: Bathyergidae
- Genus: Bathyergus
- Species: B. janetta

Binomial name
- Bathyergus janetta Thomas & Schwann, 1904
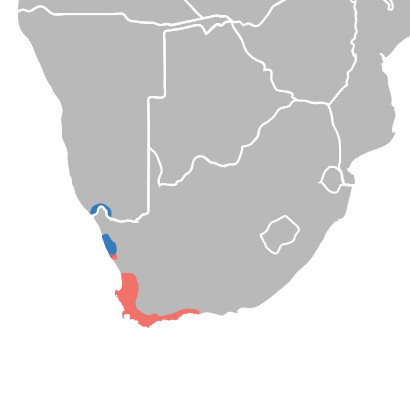
- Bathyergus distribution B. janetta in blue

= Namaqua dune mole-rat =

Species of rodent

The Namaqua dune mole-rat (Bathyergus janetta) is a species of rodent in the family Bathyergidae found in Namibia and South Africa. Its natural habitats are subtropical or tropical dry shrubland, caves, and sandy shores. The Naquama dune mole rat and its sister species, the Cape dune mole rat, have similar habitats that they occupy favoring subtropical environments however the Naquama dune mole-rat is an arid adapted solitary species while the Cape dune mole rat occupies the sandy terrain of the Cape (Lovegrove, 2001).

Bathyergus janetta is said to have a sister species called Bathyergus suillus that is paraphyletic meaning that they have common ancestral descendants but are not identical (Bennet, 2014)

The IUCN assessment states that :

Although the extent of occurrence is less than 20,000 km², and the potential impact of diamond mining remains to be quantified, at present, there is no reason to believe that the species is declining, and its presence in areas entirely restricted to public access (and with extremely high protection) suggest it should be Least Concern.
