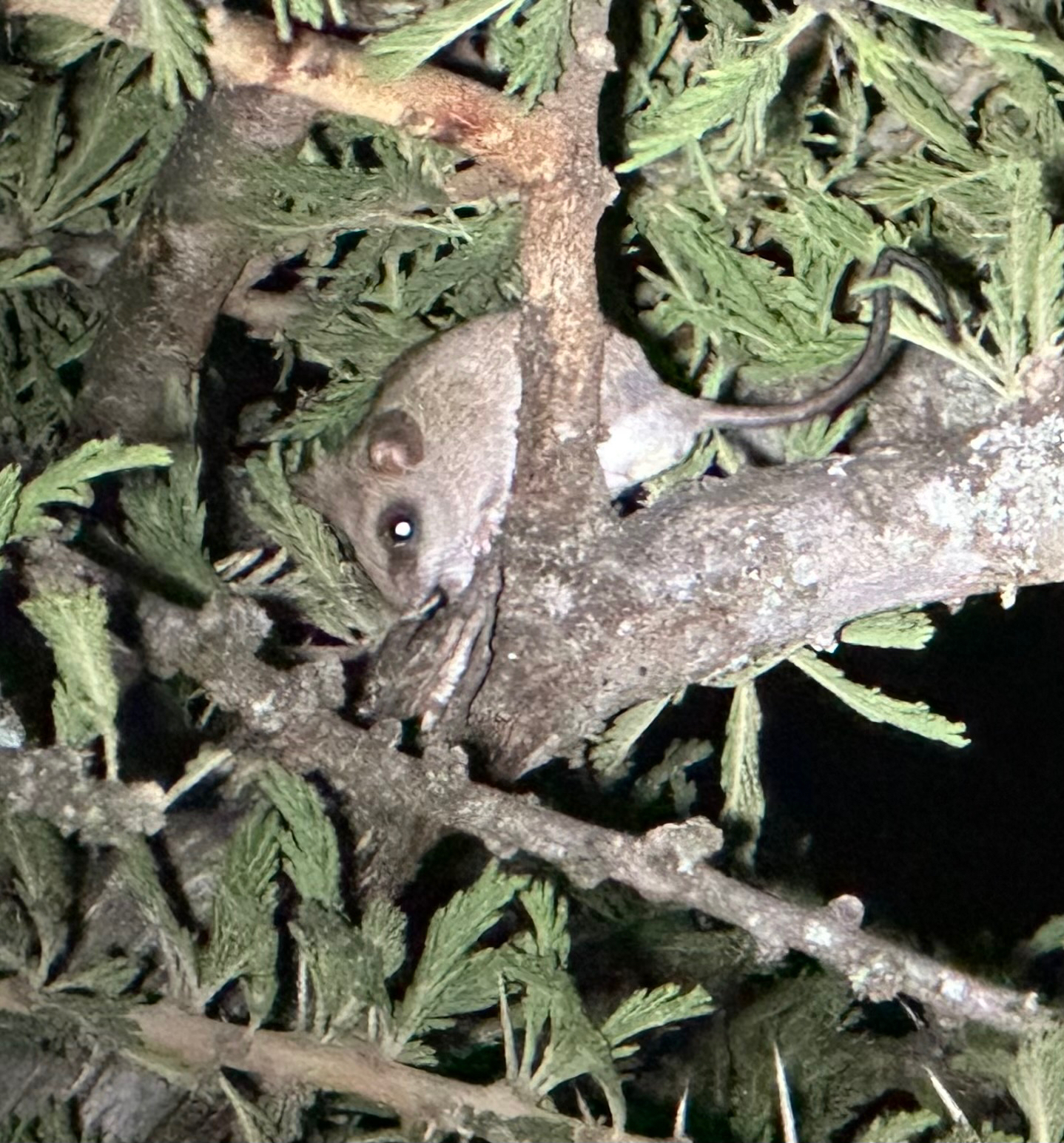

Conservation status
- Least Concern (IUCN 3.1)

Scientific classification
- Kingdom: Animalia
- Phylum: Chordata
- Class: Mammalia
- Infraclass: Placentalia
- Order: Rodentia
- Family: Muridae
- Genus: Thallomys
- Species: T. loringi

Binomial name
- Thallomys loringi (Heller, 1909)
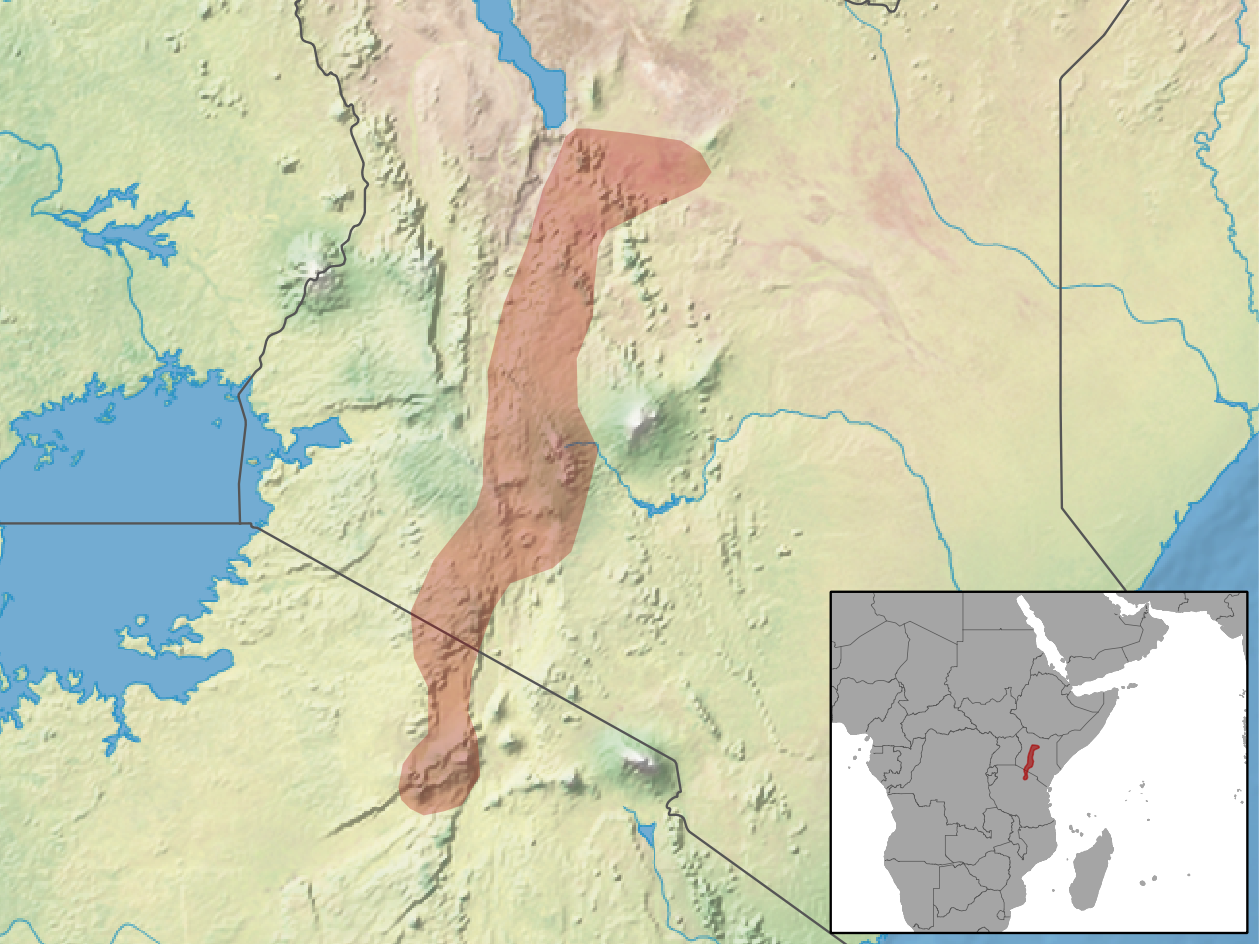

= Loring's rat =

Species of rodent

Loring's rat (Thallomys loringi) is a species of rodent in the family Muridae. It is found in Kenya and Tanzania. Its natural habitats are subtropical or tropical dry forests, dry savanna, and subtropical or tropical dry shrubland.

The species is named for John Alden Loring.

== Taxonomy ==
Loring captured the holotype for this species during the Smithsonian–Roosevelt African Expedition. Edmund Heller placed in the genus Thamnomys in his description of the species. In 1923, Oldfield Thomas and Martin Hinton moved it to the genus Thallomys.

It had then become classified as a subspecies of either Thallomys nigricauda, as Ned Hollister, Glover Morrill Allen, and John Ellerman had each done, or Thallomys damarensis, as Francis Petter had done. As of 1993, with the publication of the second edition of Mammal Species of the World; T. loringi is regarded as its own species again due to Guy Musser and Carleton's classification.
