= John Loring =

John Loring may refer to:

- John Loring (Royal Navy officer, died 1808), Royal Navy officer
- John Wentworth Loring (1775–1852), Royal Navy officer
- John Loring (designer) (1939–2026), American designer and author
- John Alden Loring (1871–1947), American naturalist
