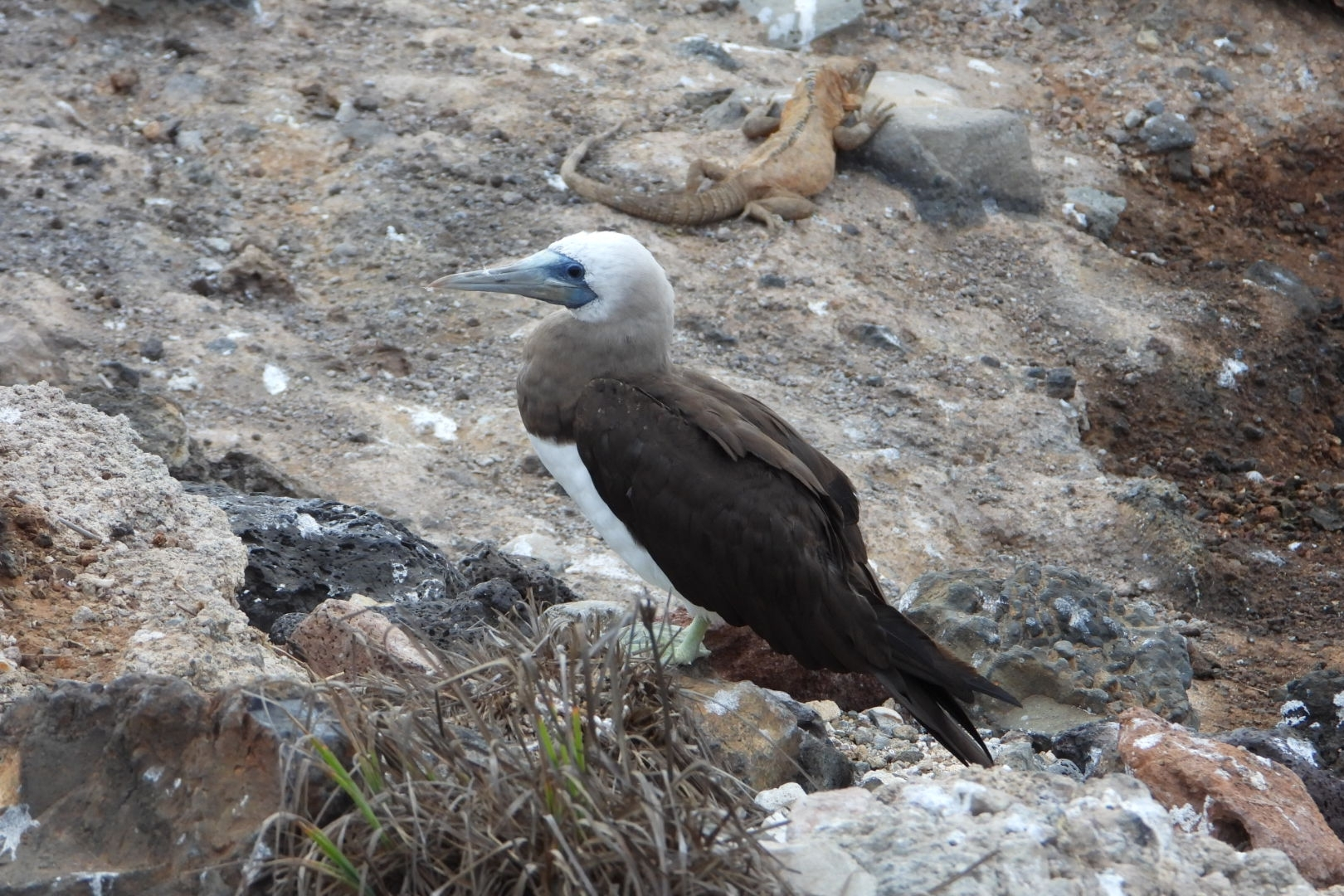
- Nominate subspecies seen in Mexico

Scientific classification
- Kingdom: Animalia
- Phylum: Chordata
- Class: Aves
- Order: Suliformes
- Family: Sulidae
- Genus: Sula
- Species: S. brewsteri

Binomial name
- Sula brewsteri Goss, 1888

Synonyms
- Sula nesiotes Heller & Snodgrass, 1901

= Cocos booby =

Species of bird

The Cocos booby (Sula brewsteri), formerly known as Brewster's booby, is a species of booby in the family Sulidae. It was formerly considered a subspecies of brown booby, but it was split by the American Ornithological Society in 2024 due to morphological and behavioural differences. It is native to the east and central Pacific Ocean.

== Taxonomy ==
The Cocos booby was first described by Nathaniel Stickney Goss in 1888 based on birds collected on San Pedro Mártir Island in the Gulf of California. He gave the birds the Latin name Sula brewsteri after his friend and fellow ornithologist William Brewster. In 1944, the ornithologist Alexander Wetmore placed Brewster's booby as a subspecies of brown booby. In 2024 a proposal to the American Ornithological Society to return to treating Brewster's booby as a distinct species was passed unanimously. Due to the changes of all North American bird names including the names of people, the name for the species was also changed from Brewster's booby to Cocos booby, after Cocos Island off Costa Rica, where the species breeds.

Cocos booby currently has either two or three subspecies depending on the taxonomic authority. (Note: The Clements Checklist does not include S. b. nesiotes) The subspecies are:

- S. b. brewsteri (Goss, 1888) - Breeds on islands in the Gulf of California and the Pacific Ocean off the Baja California Peninsula of Mexico.
- S. b. etesiaca (Thayer & Bangs, 1905) - Breeds on islands in the Pacific Ocean off of Central America and Colombia.
- S. b. nesiotes (Heller & Snodgrass, 1901) - Breeds on Clipperton Island.

== Description ==
The most immediately obvious difference from the related brown booby is the male's whitish face, varying in size by subspecies. Females of all subspecies of Cocos booby also possess a white forehead. Males of the subspecies S. b. nesiotes have the most white, with a fully white head and neck. Males of the nominate subspecies have a white face, and a pale brown neck, while males of the subspecies S. b. etesiaca only have white on their foreheads. Males also have a grey bill, rather than the yellow bill of male brown booby, and females have a pinker bill than female brown booby.

== Behaviour ==
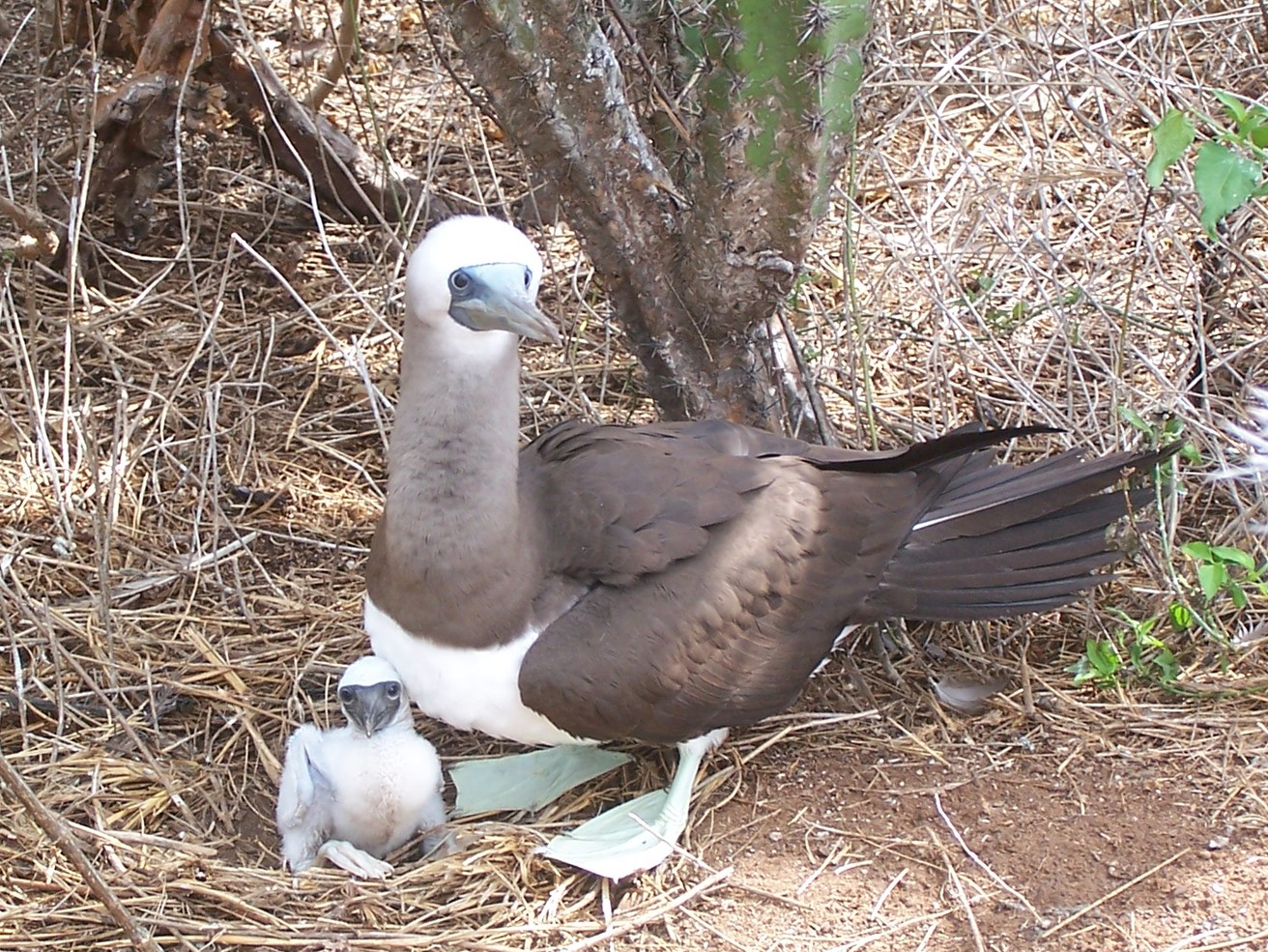
S. b. brewsteri with chick

Like other boobies, the Cocos booby is a colonial breeder, and nests on islands. When the Cocos booby comes in contact with its relative, interbreeding appears to be rare. Observations on Wake Island found that male and female Cocos booby consistently paired with each other in large brown booby colonies. Other observations found female Cocos booby among only brown boobies did not pair, while instances of hybridization have only been reported at colonies with male Cocos booby and no female Cocos booby. At least two instances of hybridization between Cocos booby and brown booby are known, one from Midway Atoll in 2020 and the other from Nakanokamishima Island from 2012 to 2014, where a chick was successfully reared.

== Distribution ==
Cocos booby are found in the East Pacific Ocean, breeding in Costa Rica, Nicaragua, Mexico, French Overseas Territories, Colombia, and the United States. It is also found offshore of Guatemala, El Salvador, and Panama. In recent years, Cocos booby has dispersed and is now found in the Central and West Pacific in Japan and Hawaii where they have now bred. They are only recent resident breeders in California, first breeding in the Channel Islands in 2017, and now regularly occur as far north on the Pacific coast as Vancouver. Large colonies exist on the islands of Clipperton Island, San Pedro Mártir Island, Isla Espíritu Santo, Isla Isabel, Islas Marietas, Socorro Island, Isla del Caño, Gorgona Island, and Cocos Island. Recently, breeding has occurred on Palmyra Atoll, Wake Island, Midway Atoll, and Moku Manu in the United States Minor Outlying Islands and Hawaii.
