= Leslie Tarlton =

Australian big game hunter and entrepreneur

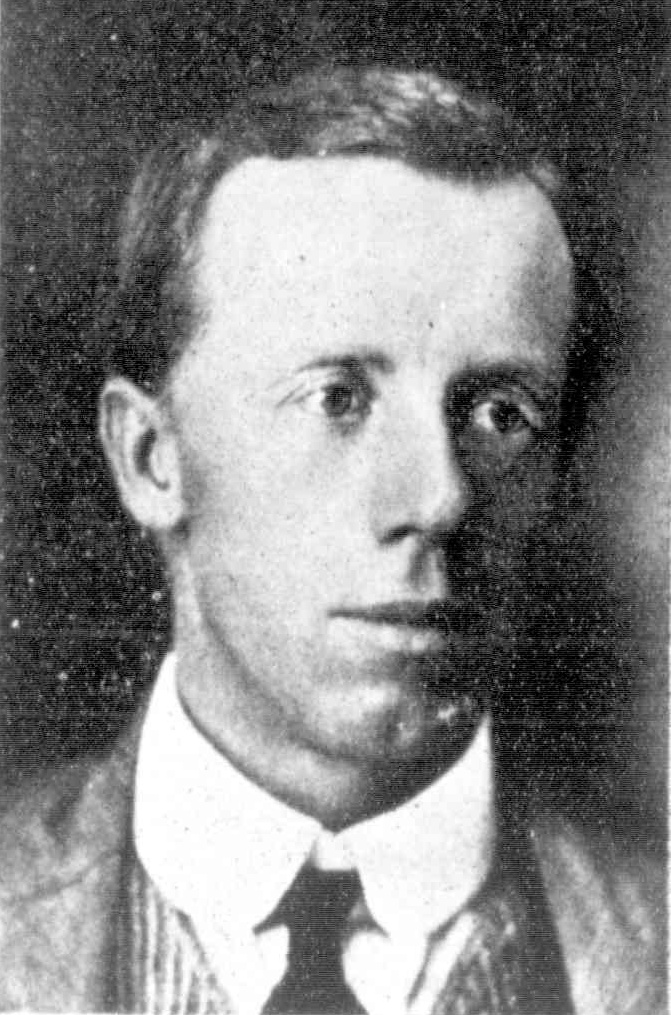
Leslie Tarlton in 1909

Leslie Jefferis Tarlton (29 July 1877 – 27 October 1951) was an Australian big game hunter and entrepreneur in British East Africa. He was the leader of numerous safaris, including the Smithsonian-Roosevelt African Expedition of 1909–1910.

== Youth and Second Boer War ==
Leslie Tarlton was born in Somerton, Glenelg, South Australia to Robert Tarlton, a banker and politician. He first attended Prince Alfred's College, Adelaide. In 1889 the family moved to Tasmania, hoping the climate would alleviate the eldest son Tatham 's tuberculosis. Leslie was attending Launceston High School in Tasmania at the time. As his brother's health continued to deteriorate, he moved to the Transvaal Highlands in the South African Republic. In 1894, also encouraged by the news of gold discoveries in the Transvaal, Robert Tarlton and his large family followed. Tatham died that same year, but the Tarltons stayed in South Africa. The three eldest of the surviving sons, including Leslie, enlisted in the first contingent of the South Australian Mounted Rifles and fought in the Second Boer War.

== Big game hunters and entrepreneurs in East Africa ==
After the war, numerous British veterans, including Leslie, his brother Henry and an Adelaide friend Victor Newland, trekked around British East Africa and German East Africa as soldiers of fortune. Some bought land or got a place in the soldiers' camps in British East Africa, others hired themselves out as guides for wealthy tourists from Europe and the United States. The Tarlton brothers and Newland arrived in Nairobi in 1903, which had been established a few years earlier as a railroad warehouse and supply depot. The city at that time was just a collection of tin sheds.

In 1904 the Tarltons and Newland were able to raise a seed capital of £200 with which they founded Newland, Tarlton & Co. The company was the first professional safari outfitter and quickly found great success organizing safaris for European and American hunting tourists. Leslie Tarlton was responsible for the organization at "N & T" and left the finances to Victor Newland. Tarlton personally accompanied expeditions by important customers, such as that of Carl and Delia Akeley in 1906. He was an excellent hunter of Cape buffalo, elephant and rhino, but his high reputation was based on his skill at lion hunting. Hunting lions was particularly dangerous. Twice Tarlton was injured by a charging lion and several of his hunters lost their lives on the job.

=== Roosevelt–Smithsonian African expedition ===
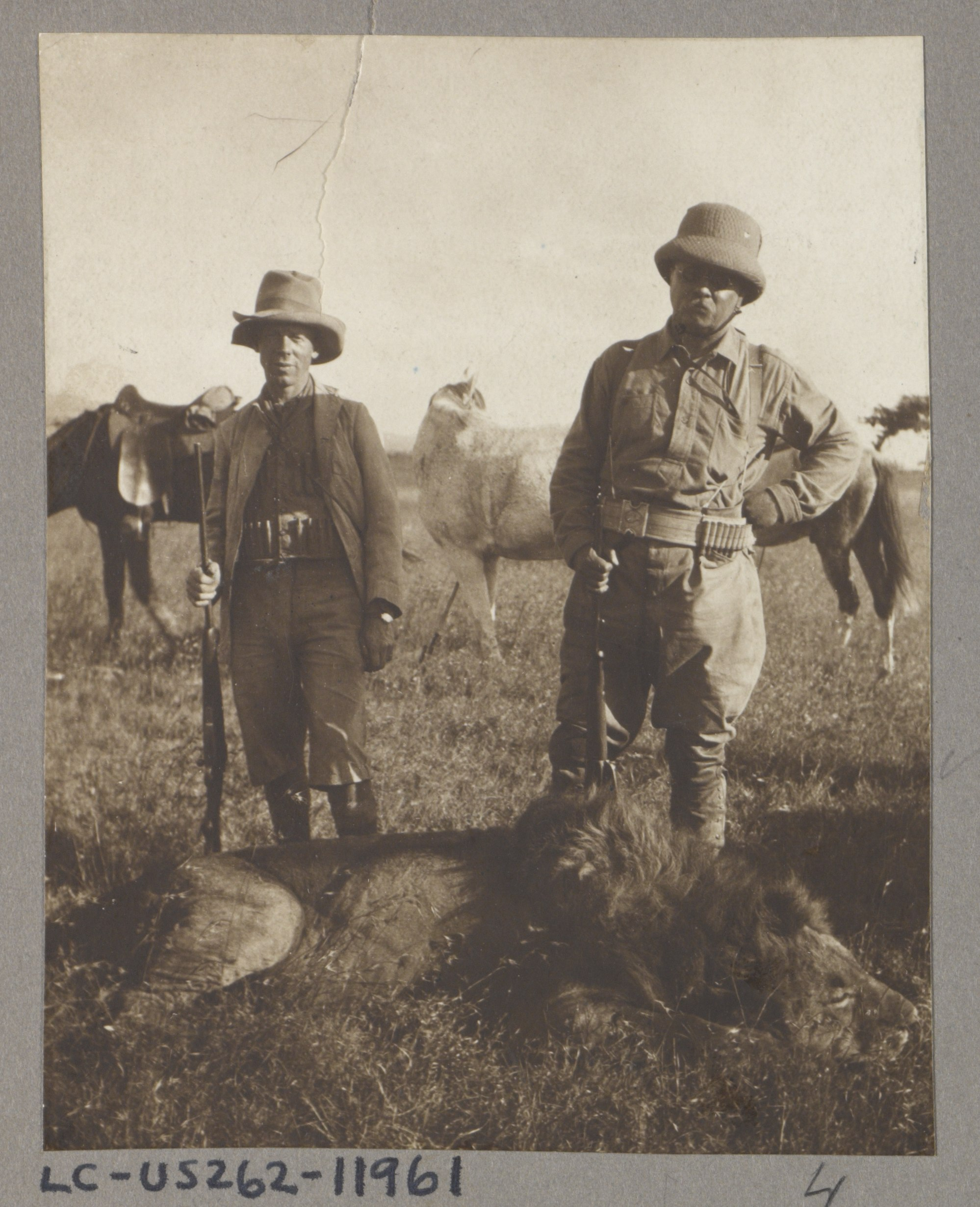
Leslie Tarlton with Theodore Roosevelt, 1909

Tarlton's most important expedition was the Smithsonian–Roosevelt African expedition from April 1909 to March 1910, in which he served as hunter and guide. Theodore Roosevelt was leader of the expedition and wanted to take over the organization himself. Only after being urged by Frederick Selous did he give in and hand over the organization to Newland, Tarlton & Co. in Nairobi. The expedition was led by Richard John Cuninghame, who was recommended to Roosevelt as the best elephant hunter in Africa. Roosevelt followed Cuninghame's advice and hired a second white hunter, Tarlton, as his "adjutant" for the time in East Africa, since no one could lead a year-long expedition with 250 men alone. Tarlton occasionally went on short hunting trips away from the large group with Kermit Roosevelt. Kermit Roosevelt later stated that Cuninghame's marksmanship matched that of his father. But both were surpassed by Tarlton. The enormous number of animals shot meant that Edmund Heller, who was also employed as a taxidermist, often had to be assisted by Cuninghame. Occasionally Tarlton had to be called in for this work as well.

The route ran from Mombasa in British East Africa to the Belgian Congo, on to the Nile and up the river to Khartoum. More than 11,000 animals were shot or captured during the voyage, including nearly 5,000 mammals and nearly 4,000 birds. Theodore Roosevelt and his son Kermit shot 512 big game alone. Throughout the expedition Cuninghame was responsible for the selection and guidance of the almost 200 porters as well as the askari and the servants for weapons, horses and tents, assisted by Tarlton. A few months after the expedition, in July 1910, Tarlton traveled to the United States. He visited Roosevelt's ranch and was shown the first American national parks.

In 1925 Tarlton led the US bow hunter Saxton Pope on a lion hunt. Pope shot seven lions with his bow. However, Tarlton forbade him from bow hunting buffalo, elephant and rhino because he was concerned that Pope could only wound an animal and provoke an attack. In the 1930s Leslie Tarlton ran safaris for the Prince of Wales (later King Edward VIII) and the Duke of York (later George VI).

The Tarltons took an active part in the life of the white upper class in British East Africa. Leslie Tarlton's brother Henry was considered one of the best jockeys in the colony.
