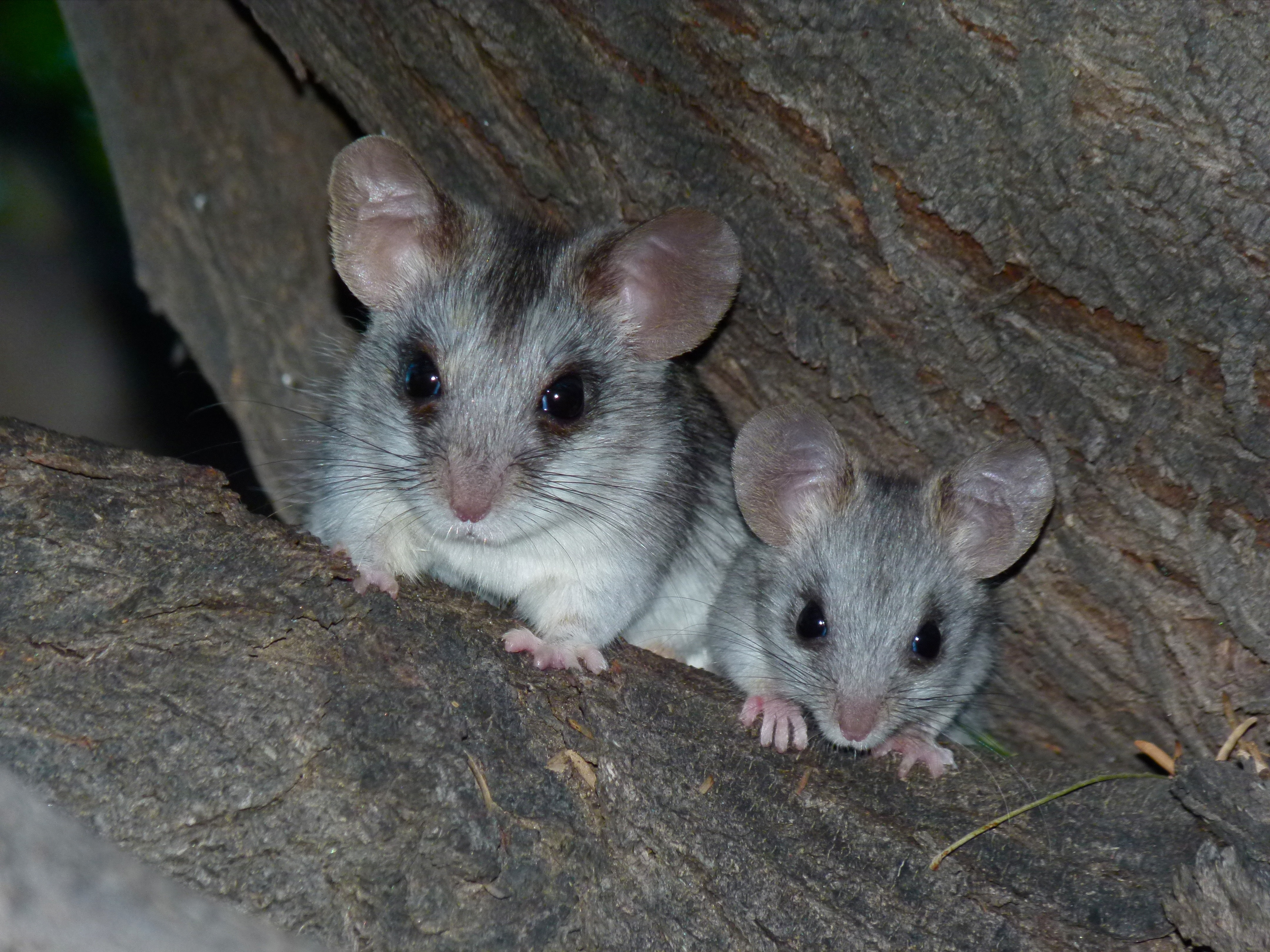
- Black-tailed tree rat (Thallomys nigricauda)

Scientific classification
- Kingdom: Animalia
- Phylum: Chordata
- Class: Mammalia
- Order: Rodentia
- Family: Muridae
- Tribe: Arvicanthini
- Genus: Thallomys; Thomas, 1920

Type species
- Mus nigricauda Thomas, 1882

Species
- See text

= Thallomys =

Genus of rodents

Thallomys is a genus of rodent in the family Muridae endemic to Africa. It contains four species:

- Loring's rat (Thallomys loringi)
- Black-tailed tree rat (Thallomys nigricauda)
- Acacia rat (Thallomys paedulcus)
- Shortridge's rat (Thallomys shortridgei)
