= Shortridge's rat =

Conservation status
- Data Deficient (IUCN 3.1)

Scientific classification
- Kingdom: Animalia
- Phylum: Chordata
- Class: Mammalia
- Order: Rodentia
- Family: Muridae
- Genus: Thallomys
- Species: T. shortridgei

Binomial name
- Thallomys shortridgei Thomas & Hinton, 1923
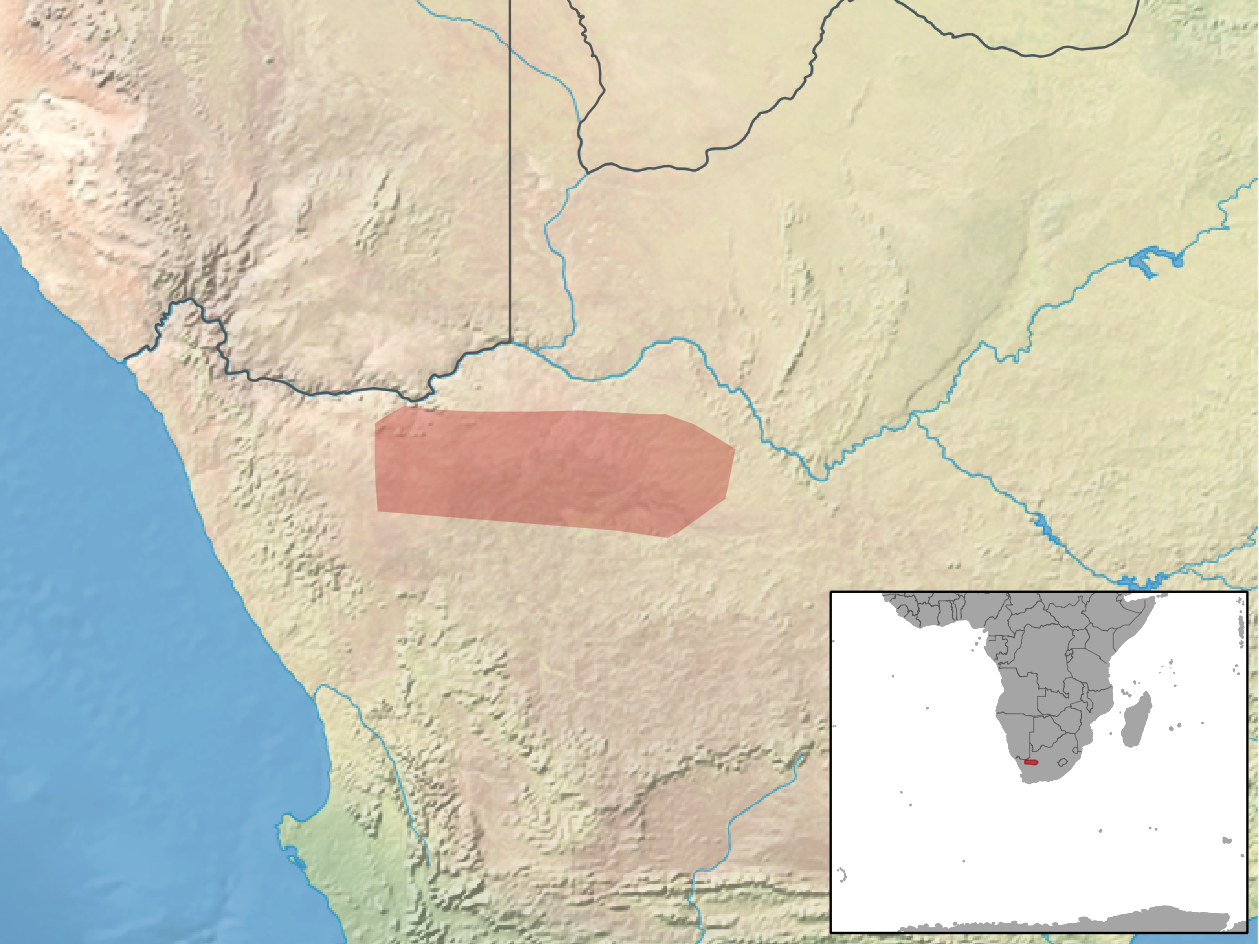

Species of rodent

Shortridge's rat (Thallomys shortridgei) is a species of rodent in the family Muridae. It is found only in South Africa. Its natural habitat is subtropical or tropical dry shrubland.
