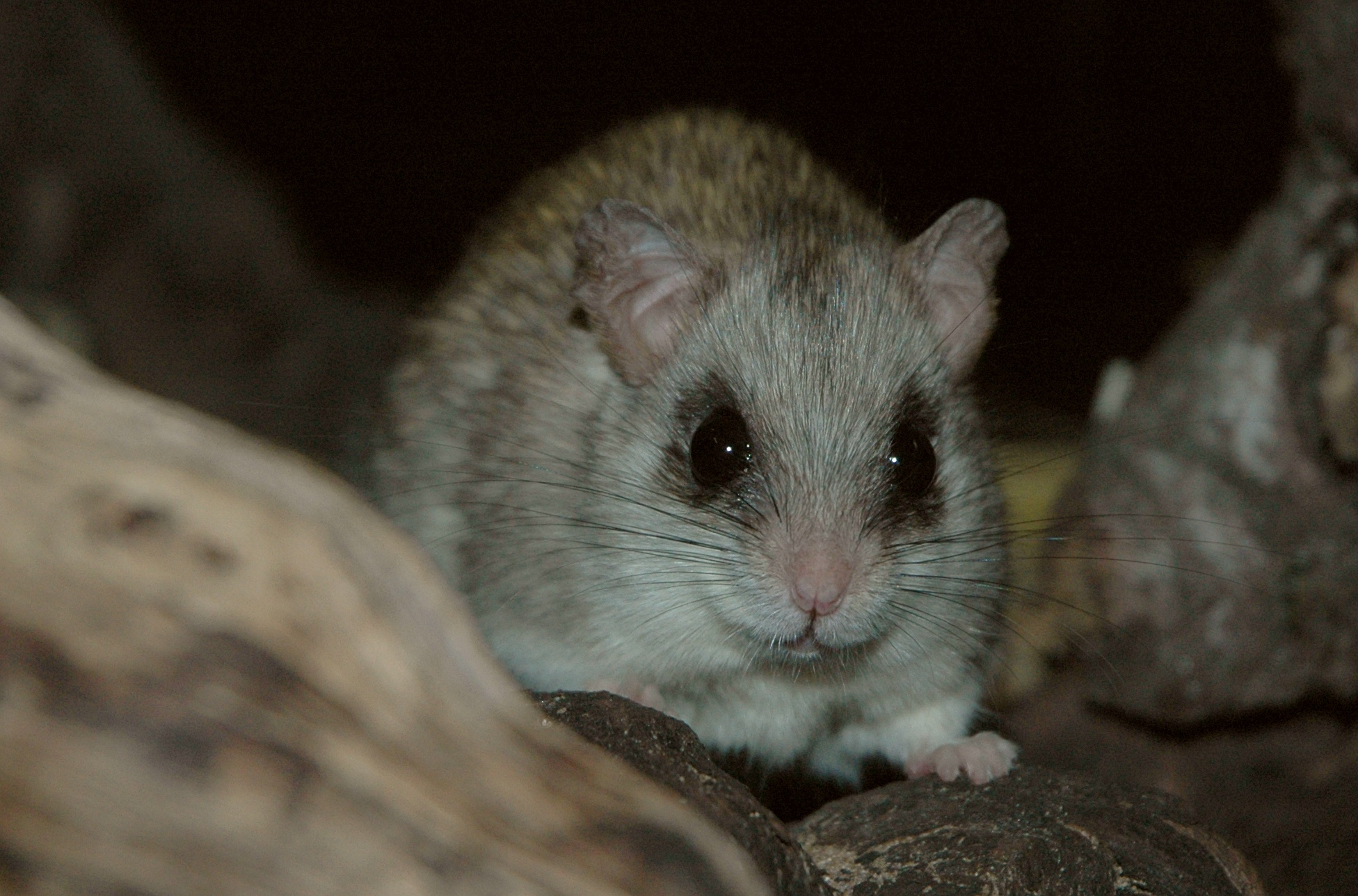

Conservation status
- Least Concern (IUCN 3.1)

Scientific classification
- Kingdom: Animalia
- Phylum: Chordata
- Class: Mammalia
- Order: Rodentia
- Family: Muridae
- Genus: Thallomys
- Species: T. paedulcus

Binomial name
- Thallomys paedulcus (Sundevall, 1846)

= Acacia rat =

Species of rodent

The acacia rat (Thallomys paedulcus), or black-tailed tree rat, is a species of rodent in the family Muridae. It is a small arboreal rodent that is extensively dependent on Acacia trees. It is found in Botswana, Democratic Republic of the Congo, Ethiopia, Kenya, Malawi, Mozambique, Namibia, Somalia, South Africa, Eswatini, Tanzania, Zambia, and Zimbabwe. Its natural habitat is subtropical or tropical dry shrubland.

== Sources ==
- Child, M.F. & Taylor, P. (2017) [errata version of 2016 assessment]. "Thallomys paedulcus". IUCN Red List of Threatened Species. 2016 e.T21692A115163143. doi:10.2305/IUCN.UK.2016-3.RLTS.T21692A22435824.en.
- Musser, G. G.; Carleton, M. D. (2005). "Superfamily Muroidea". In Wilson, D. E.; Reeder, D. M. (eds.). Mammal Species of the World: A Taxonomic and Geographic Reference (3rd ed.). Johns Hopkins University Press. p. 1509. ISBN 978-0-8018-8221-0. OCLC 62265494.
- Karantanis, N., Rychlik, L., Herrel, A., & Youlatos, D. (2017). Arboreality in acacia rats ( Thallomys paedulcus ; Rodentia, Muridae): gaits and gait metrics. Journal of Zoology : Proceedings of the Zoological Society of London., 303(2), 107–119. https://doi.org/10.1111/jzo.12473
- Meyer, J., Steinhauser, J., Jeltsch, F., & Brandl, R. (2007). Large trees, acacia shrubs, and the density of Thallomys nigricauda in the Thornveld savannah of South Africa. Journal of Arid Environments., 68(3), 363–370. https://doi.org/10.1016/j.jaridenv.2006.06.001
