= Hilda Hempl Heller =

American scientist

- Heller in 1924, by Watson Davis
- Born: August 5, 1891; Ann Arbor, Michigan, U.S.
- Died: May 1, 1964 (aged 72); Arequipa, Peru
- Occupations: Bacteriologist, zoologist, medical researcher, science writer
- Spouse: Edmund Heller (m. 1918, div. 1928)

Hilda Hempl Heller (August 5, 1891 – May 1, 1964) was an American zoologist, bacteriologist, medical researcher and science writer. She traveled in Africa and South America for her research, and taught bacteriology in the medical school at the University of California, San Francisco.

== Early life and education ==
Hempl was born in Ann Arbor, Michigan and raised in Palo Alto, California, the daughter of George Hempl and Anna Belle Purmont Hempl. Her father was a philologist and German professor at Stanford University. She graduated from Stanford in 1913, earned a master's degree at the University of Michigan, and completed doctoral studies with pathologist Karl Friedrich Meyer at the University of California in 1920. She held both a Ph.D. and an M.D.

== Career ==
In the 1910s and 1920s, Heller studied bacteria at the University of California Medical School in San Francisco. She taught bacteriology courses at the medical school, and to women training for wartime work.

Heller accompanied her husband on a Field Museum research expedition in central and southern Africa. She took photographs and wrote about the expedition for American publications. She also lectured on the experience. She became a member of the Society of Women Geographers in 1928. She was a medical researcher and science writer, and made other studies in Peru, where she lived in her later years.

== Publications ==
=== Bacteriology ===
- "Some Proteolytic Anaerobes Isolated from Septic Wounds" (1918)
- "Etiology of Acute Gangrenous Infections of Animals: A Discussion of Blackleg, Braxy, Malignant Edema and Whale Septicemia" (1920)
- "Phylogenetic Position of the Bacteria" (1921)
- "Principles Concerning the Isolation of Anaerobes" (1921)
- "A Detailed Bacteriologic Study of a Case of Gas Gangrene Following a Compound Fracture" (1921, with Edna L. Barney)
- "Studies Concerning a Rational Basis for the Classification of the Anaerobic Bacteria" (1921)
- "Certain Genera of the Clostridiaceae" (1921)
- "The Study of Colony Formation in Deep Agar" (1922)
- "Notes on the Genus Nicolaierillus (B. tetani)" and "Mutations in the Genus Nicolaierillus (B. tetani)" (1922)
- "Classification of the Anaerobic Bacteria" (1922)

=== Zoology ===
- "The Vanishing Race of Pronghorns" (1923, with Edmund Heller)
- "Animales Silvestres de la Sierra Peruana 'Engreídos' por Sus Dueños" (1925)
- "Weirdest of Tiny Monsters in the Reptile World" (1928)

== Personal life ==
Hempl was engaged to a fellow Stanford student in 1911, but married fellow zoologist Edmund Heller in 1918. They divorced in 1928. She died in 1964, at age 73, in Arequipa, Peru.
