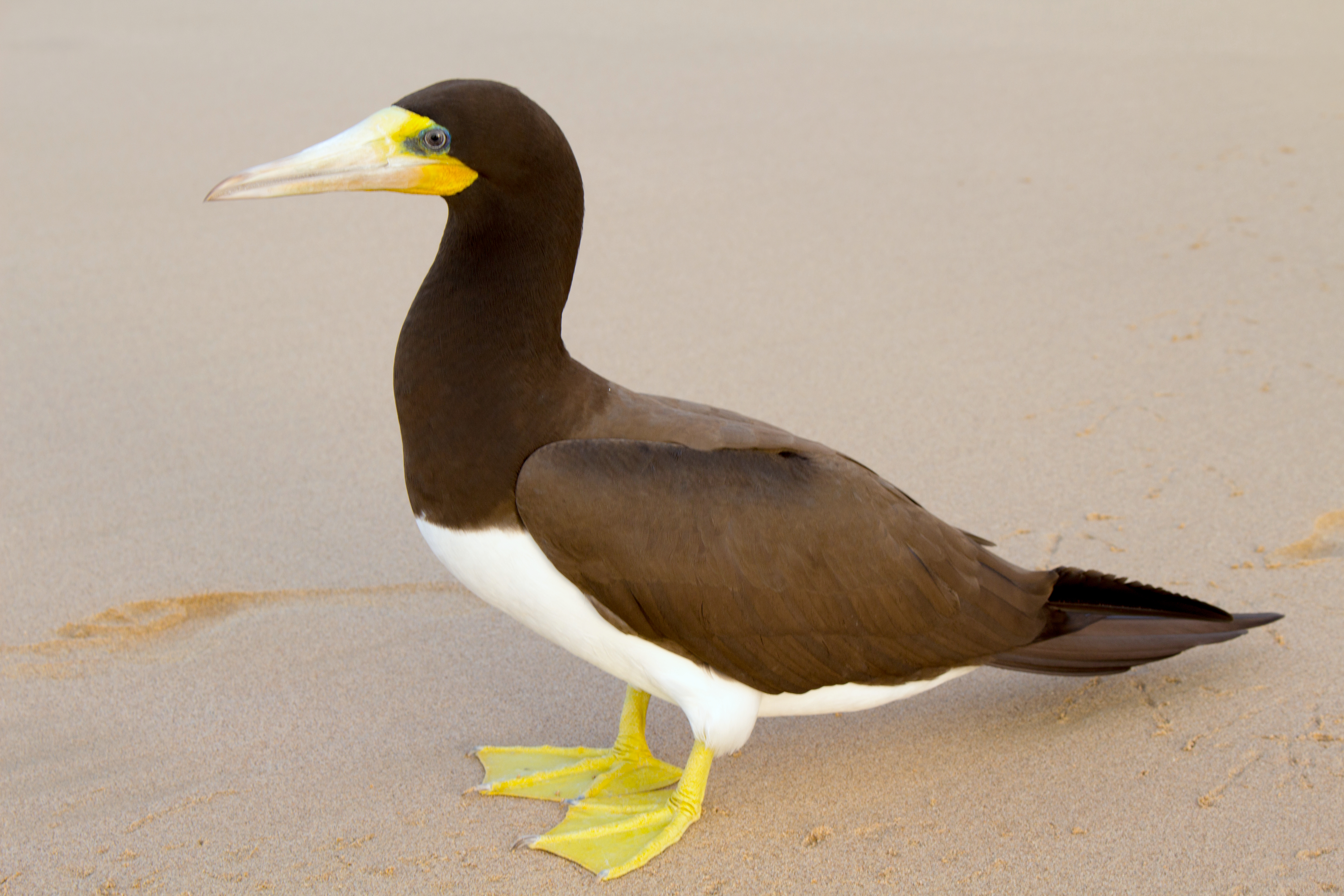
- Male S. l. leucogaster, Fernando de Noronha, tropical western Atlantic
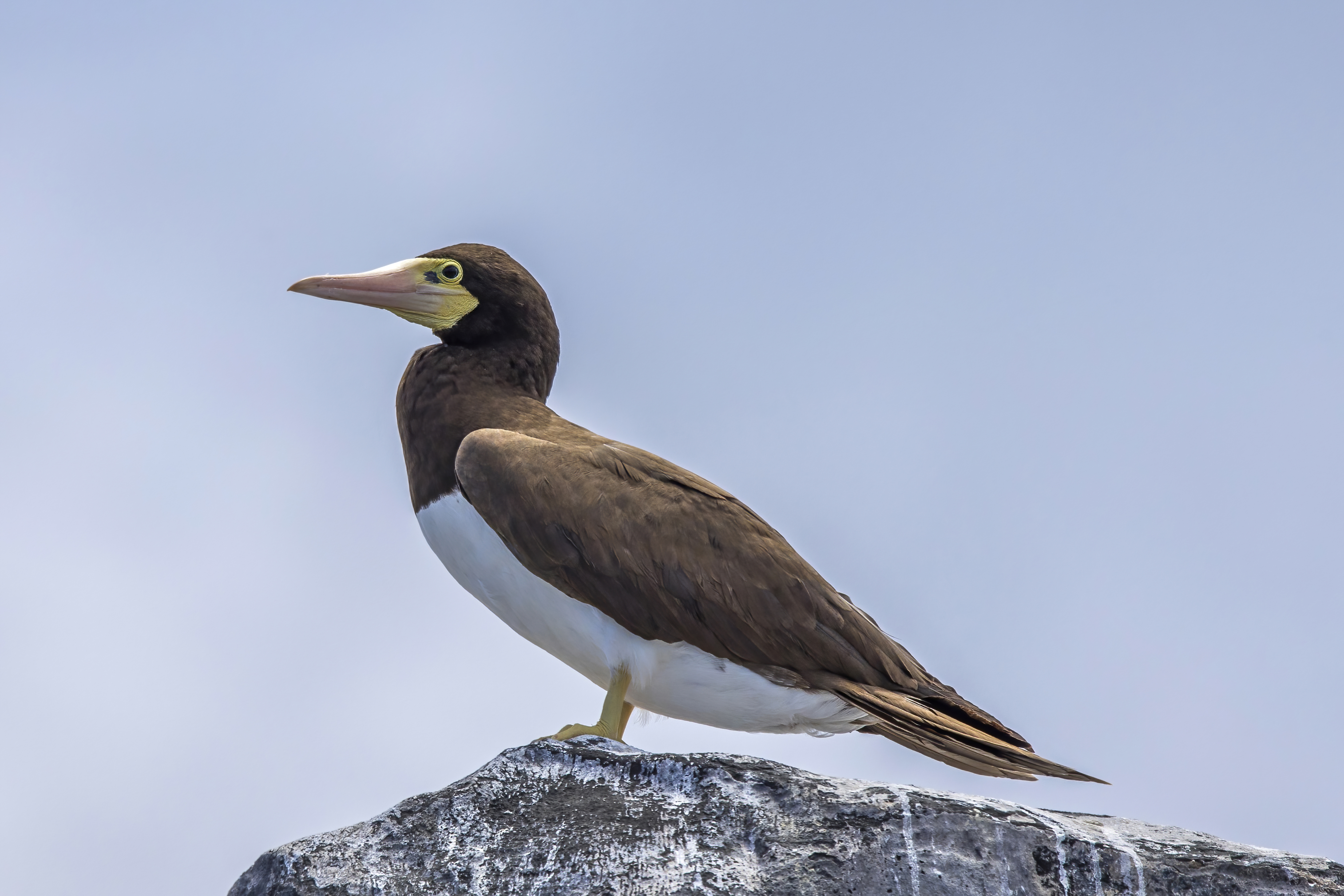
- Female S. l. leucogaster, Príncipe island, São Tomé and Príncipe

Conservation status
- Least Concern (IUCN 3.1)

Scientific classification
- Kingdom: Animalia
- Phylum: Chordata
- Class: Aves
- Order: Suliformes
- Family: Sulidae
- Genus: Sula
- Species: S. leucogaster

Binomial name
- Sula leucogaster (Boddaert, 1783)
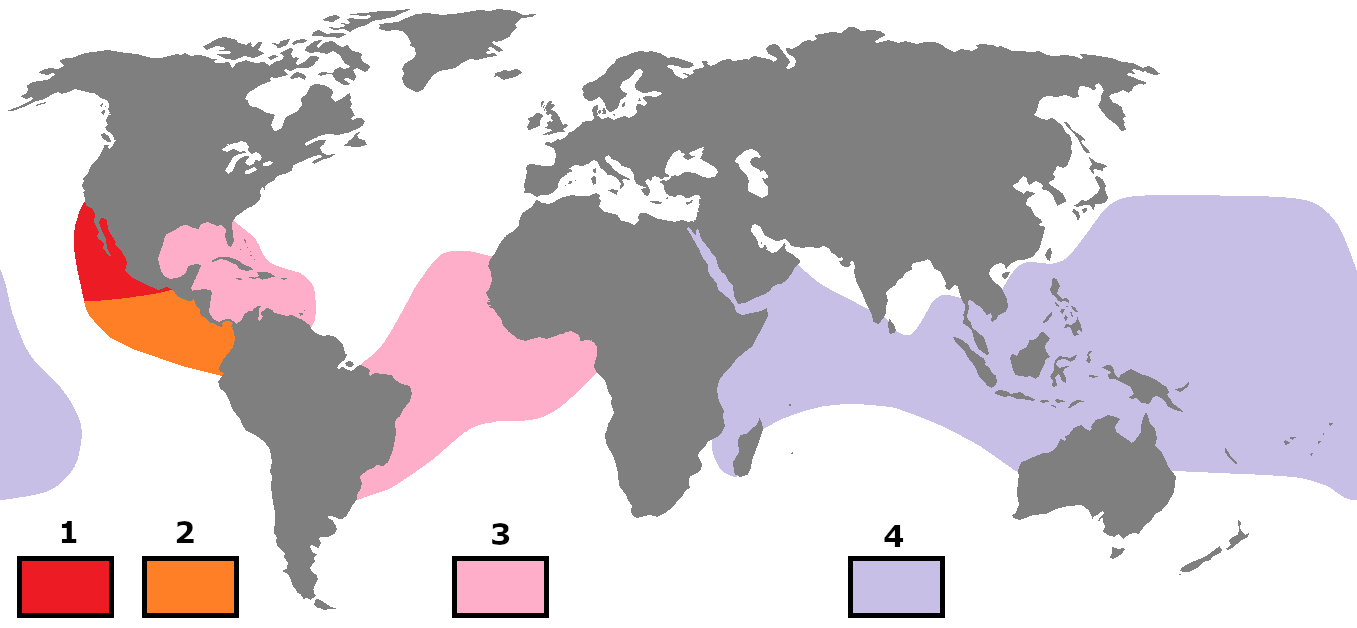
- World range, with Brown booby subspecies in pink and purple: S. b. brewsteri S. b. etesiaca S. l. leucogaster S. l. plotus

= Brown booby =

Brown booby Temporal range: Middle Quaternary to recent

Species of bird

The brown booby (Sula leucogaster) is a large seabird in the booby and gannet family Sulidae, of which it is one of the most common and widespread species. It has a pantropical range, which overlaps with that of other booby species. The gregarious brown booby commutes and forages at low height over inshore waters. Flocks plunge-dive to take small fish, especially when these are driven near the surface by their predators. They nest only on the ground, and roost on solid objects rather than the water surface.

== Taxonomy ==
The brown booby was described by the French polymath Georges-Louis Leclerc, Comte de Buffon in his Histoire Naturelle des Oiseaux in 1781. The bird was also illustrated in a hand-coloured plate engraved by François-Nicolas Martinet in the Planches Enluminées D'Histoire Naturelle which was produced under the supervision of Edme-Louis Daubenton to accompany Buffon's text. Buffon did not include a scientific name with his description but in 1783 the Dutch naturalist Pieter Boddaert coined the binomial name Pelecanus leucogaster in his catalogue of the Planches Enluminées. The type locality is Cayenne in French Guiana.

The current genus Sula was introduced by the French zoologist Mathurin Jacques Brisson in 1760; the new genus Sula is given from the Norwegian word for a gannet; while its specific epithet leucogaster is from Ancient Greek λευκο leuko for "white" and γαστηρ gastēr for "belly".

There are two recognised subspecies:

- S. l. leucogaster (Boddaert, 1783) – Caribbean and Atlantic Islands
- S. l. plotus (Forster, JR, 1844) – Red Sea through the Indian Ocean to the west and central Pacific

In 2024, two other formerly accepted subspecies, S. l. brewsteri and S. l. etesiaca, were split out as a separate species Cocos booby Sula brewsteri by the American Ornithological Society, Clements Checklist, and the IOC World Bird List.

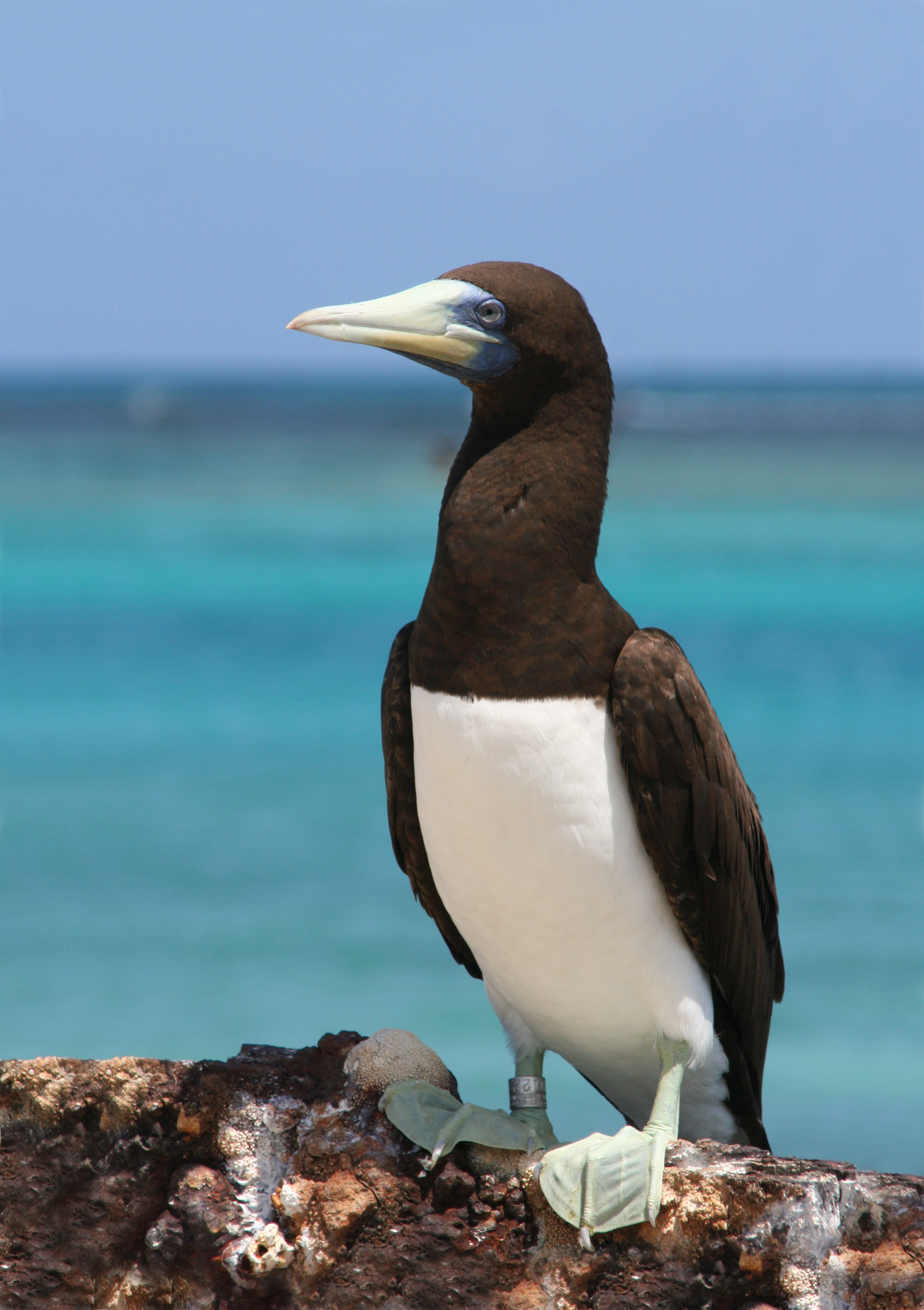
male S. l. plotus, French Frigate Shoals

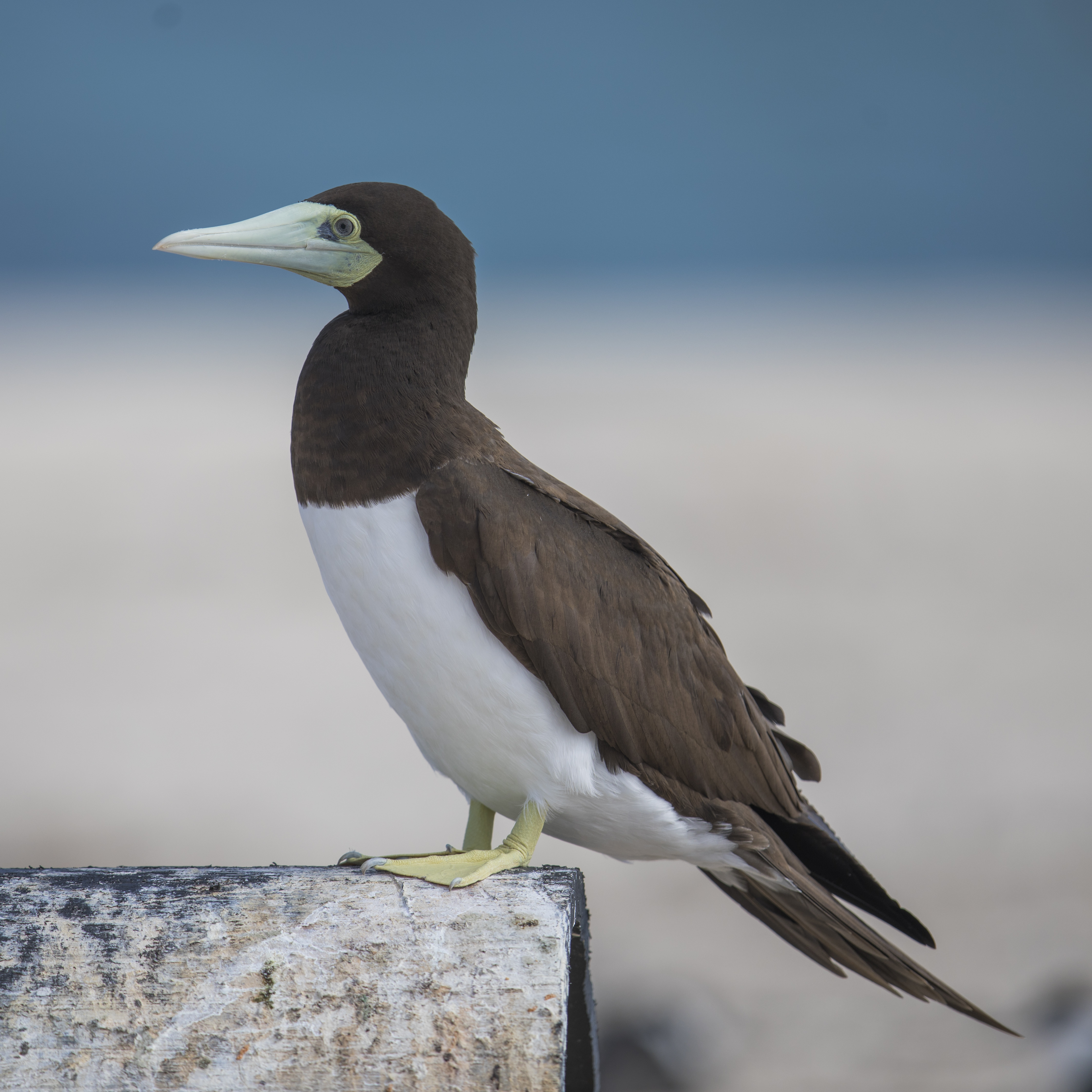
female S. l. plotus, Green Island, Queensland

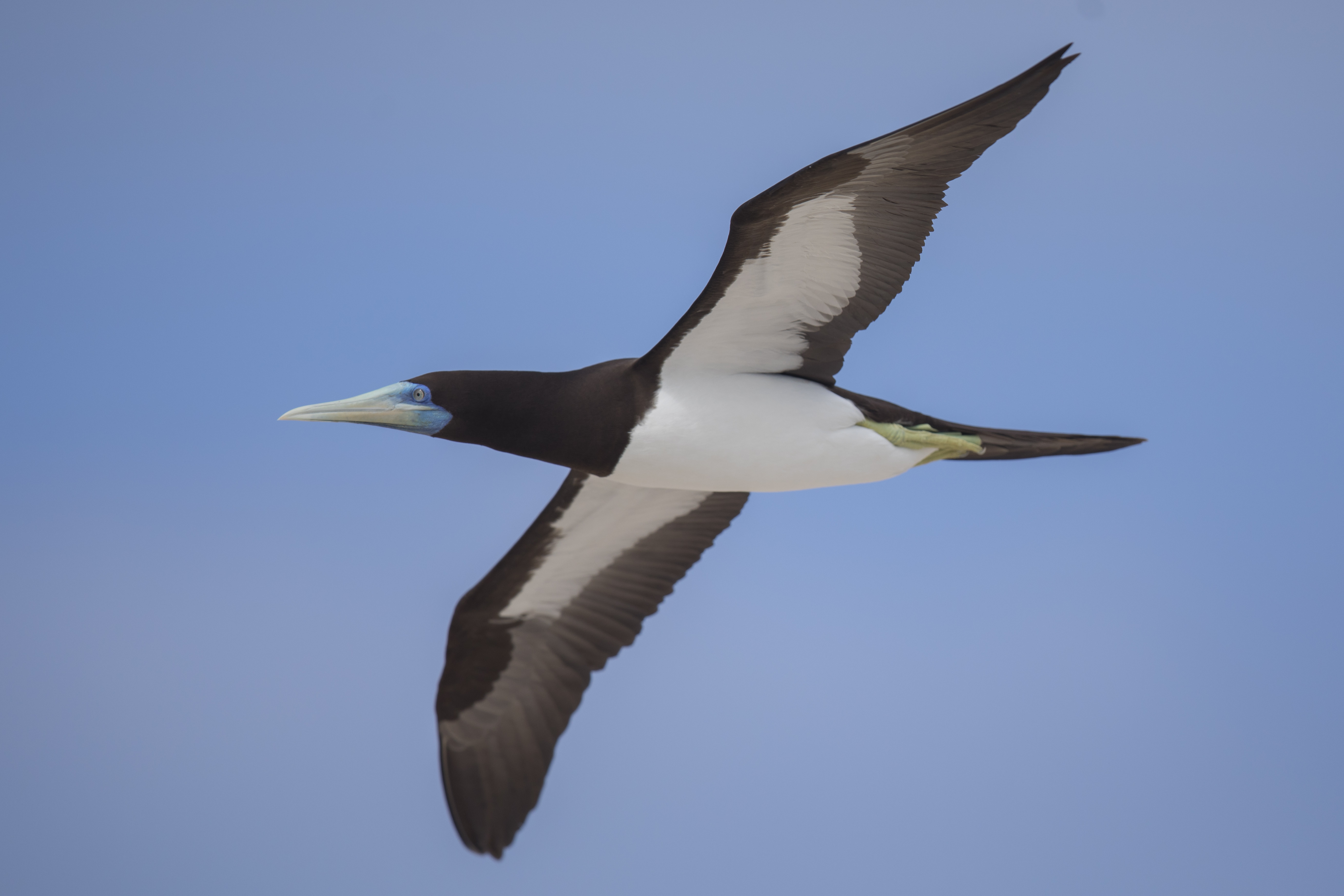
male S. l. plotus, Queensland

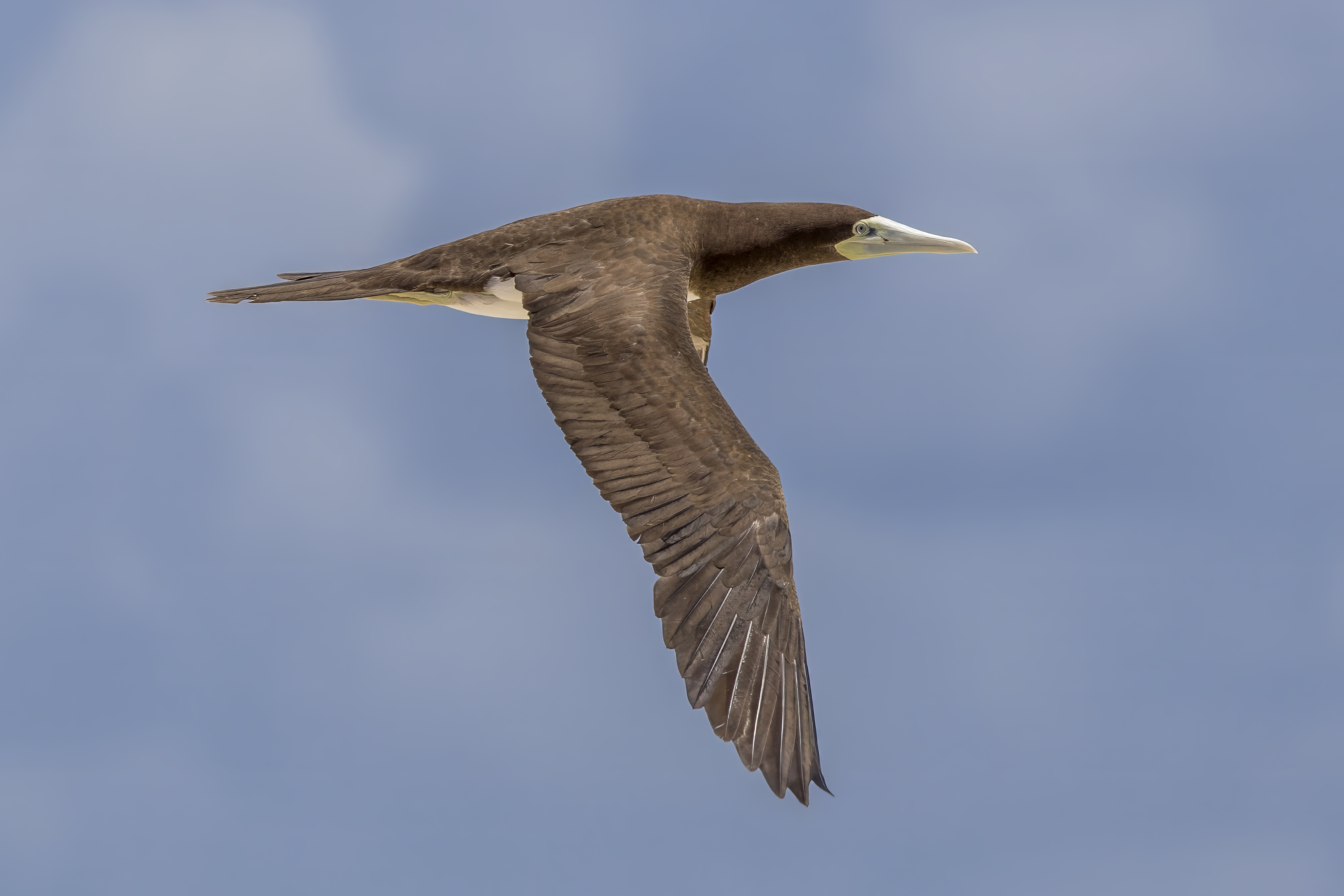
female S. l. plotus, Queensland

== Description ==
A brown booby in flight

The booby's head and upper body (back) is covered in dark brown to blackish plumage, with the remainder (belly) being a contrasting white. The bare-part colours vary geographically, but not seasonally. The species also displays sexual dimorphism of the bare part colours, the males having a blue orbital ring, as opposed to the yellow orbital ring of the female.

Female boobies reach about 80 centimetres (31 in) in length; their wingspans measure up to 150 cm (4.9 ft), and they can weigh up to 1,300 g (2.9 lb). Male boobies reach about 75 centimetres (30 in) in length; their wingspans measure up to 140 cm (4.6 ft), and they can weigh up to 1,000 g (2.2 lb).

Unlike other species of sulid, the juvenile plumage already resembles that of the adult. They are grey-brown with darkening on the head, upper surfaces of the wings and tail, while the lower breast and underpart plumages are heavily flecked brown on white.

Their beaks are quite sharp and contain jagged edges. They have fairly short wings resulting in a fast flap rate, but long, tapered tails. While these birds are typically silent, they occasionally make grunting or quacking sounds.

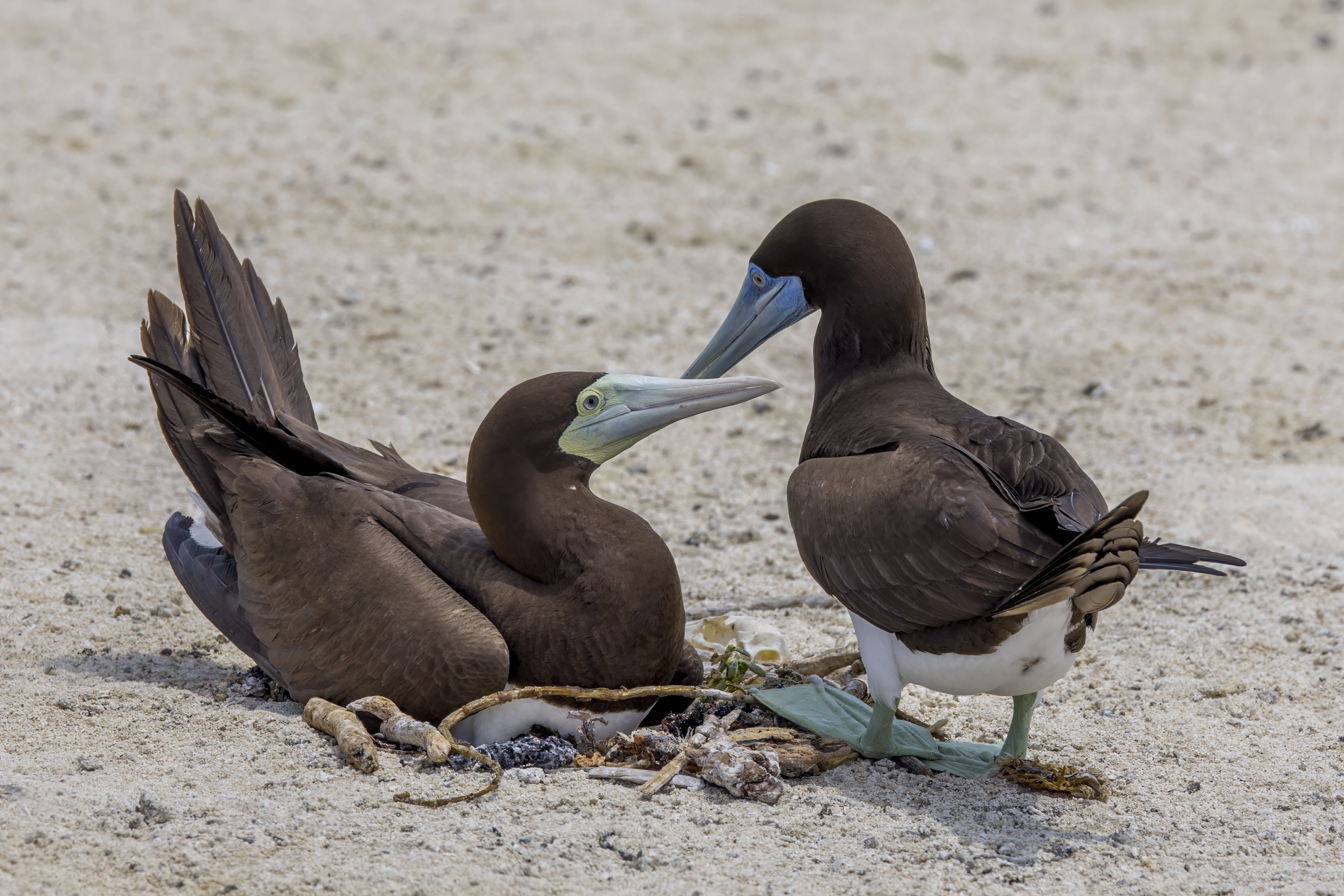
Female and male S. l. plotus at their stick nest

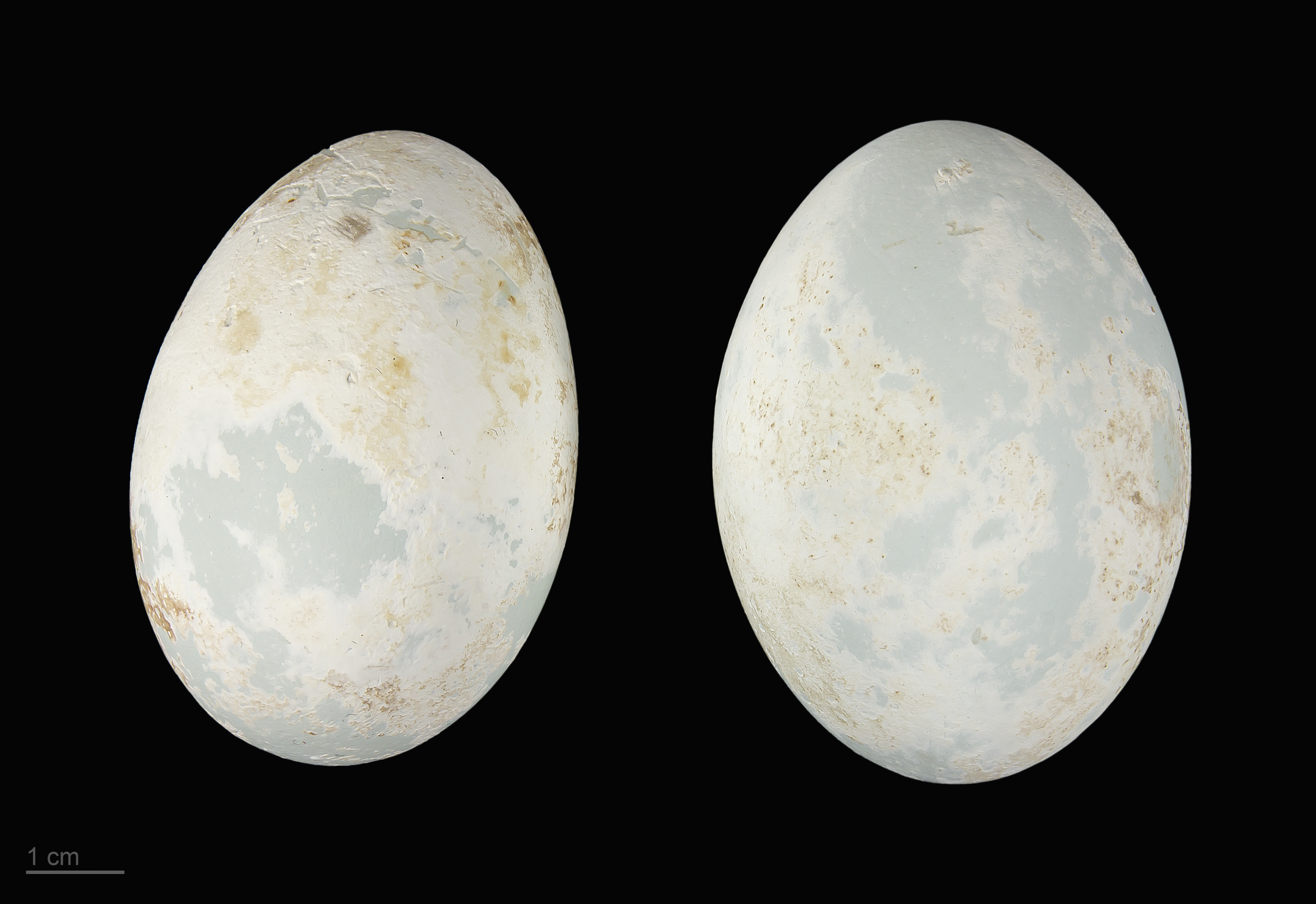
eggs - MHNT

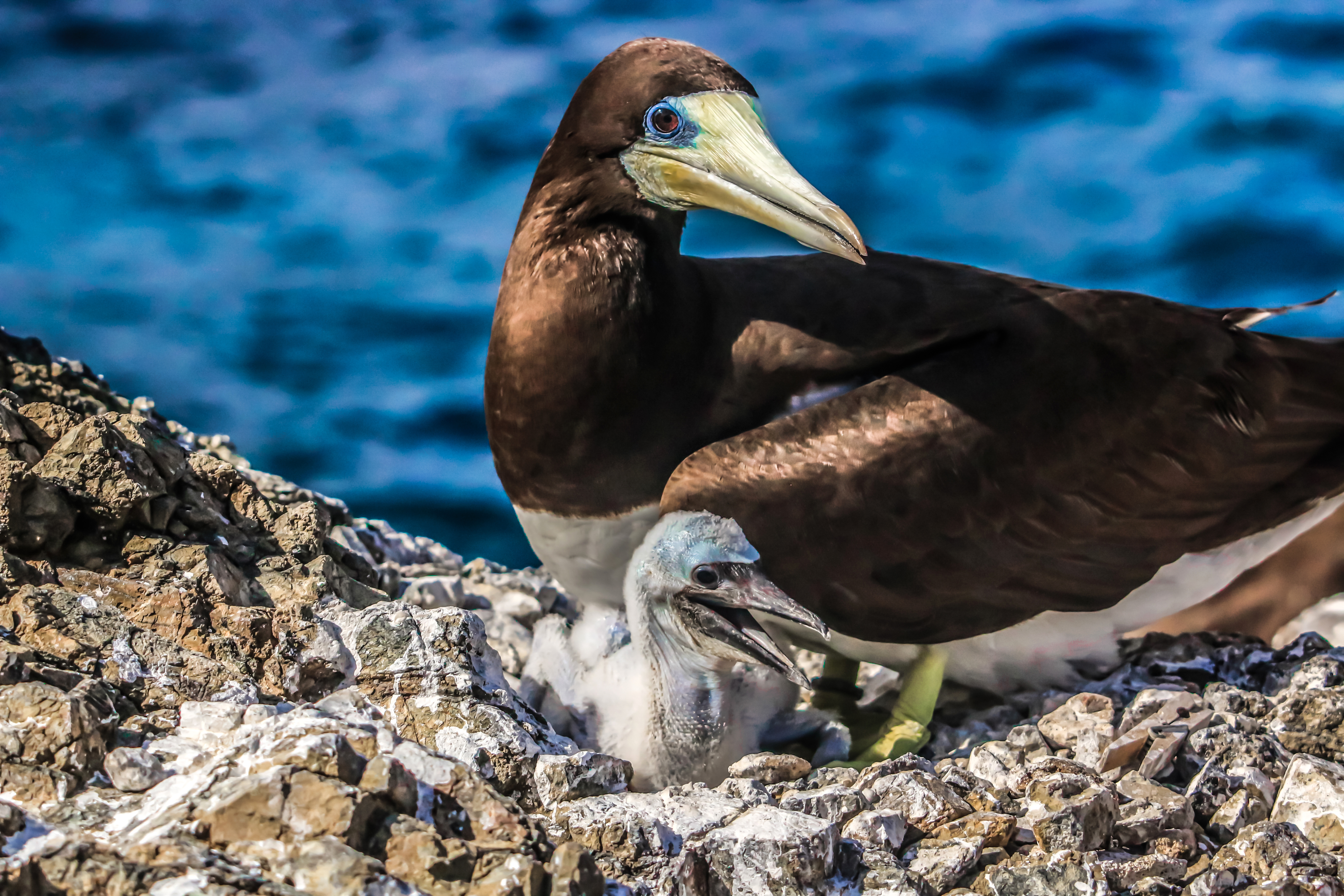
Male with chick in São Pedro and São Paulo Archipelago, Pernambuco, Brazil

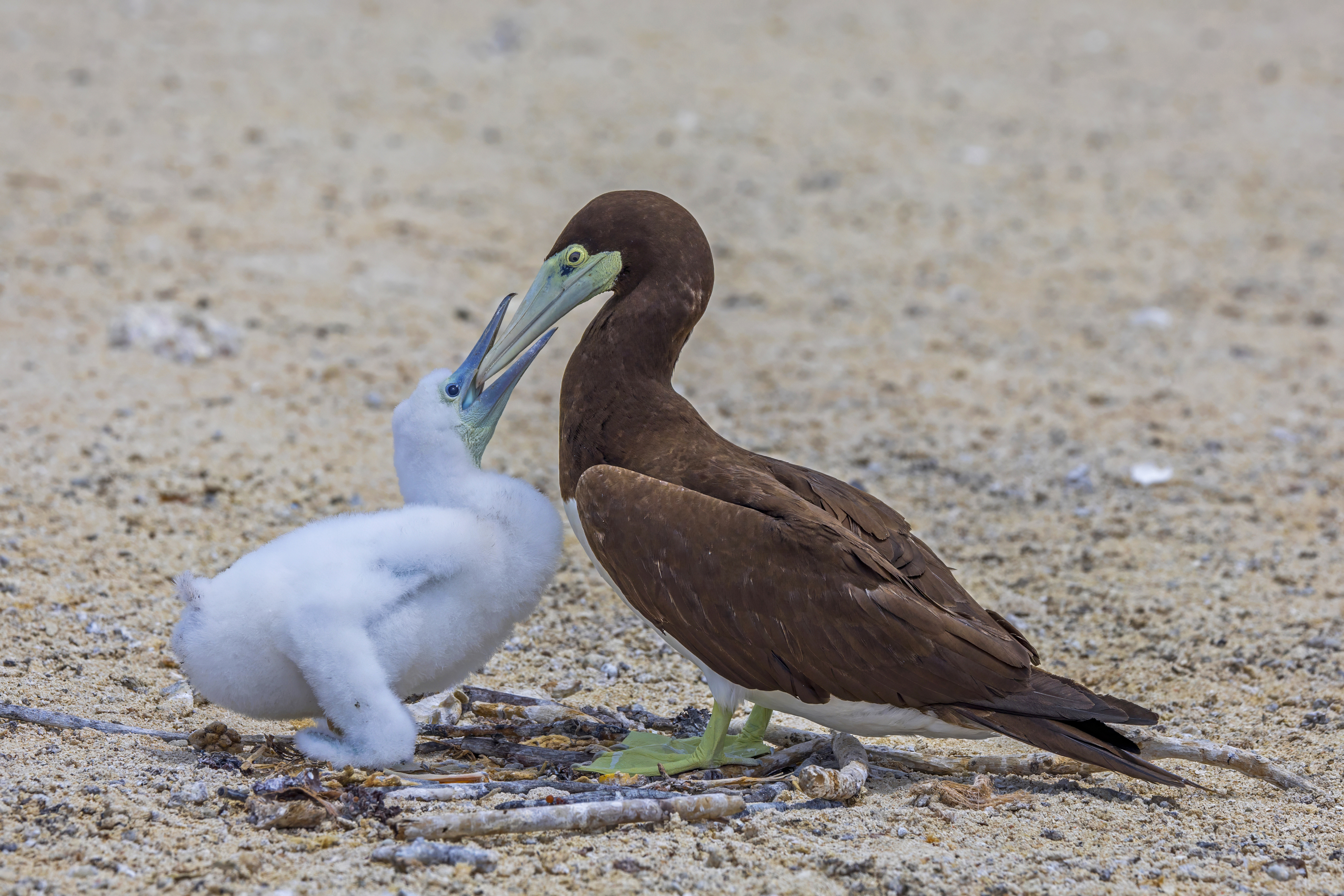
feeding S. l. plotus chick

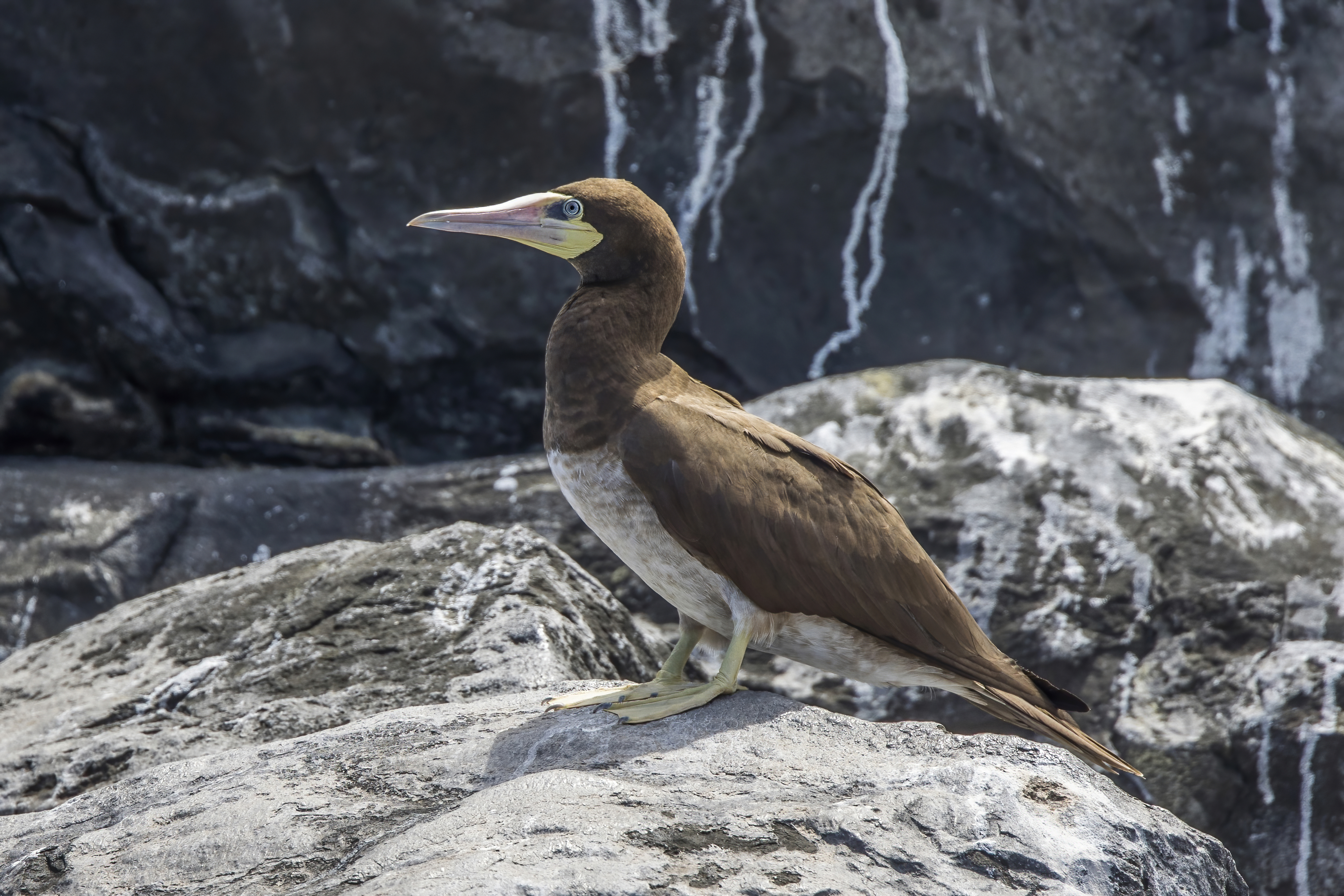
Juvenile S. l. leucogaster, São Tomé and Príncipe

== Ecology ==
This species breeds on islands and coasts in the pantropical areas of the Atlantic, Indian and Pacific oceans. They frequent the breeding grounds of the islands in the Gulf of Mexico and the Caribbean Sea. With the rise in pollution in the world, brown boobies have been using marine debris to make their nests, with 90.1% of these nest were consisted of plastic, while nests near shipwreck have a high percentage of the wreckage debris. This bird nests in large colonies, laying two chalky blue eggs on the ground in a mound of broken shells and vegetation, but usually raises just one chick, the second one to hatch being unable to compete for food with its older sibling, or even ejected from the nest by it. It winters at sea over a wider area.

Brown booby pairs may remain together over several seasons. They perform elaborate greeting rituals, and are also spectacular divers, plunging into the ocean at high speed. They eat mainly small fish (such as flying fish, mullets, halfbeaks, anchovies, goatfish, crowned squirrelfish, and Indian mackerels), squids (including the family Ommastrephidae), or shrimps which gather in groups near the surface and may catch leaping fish while skimming the surface. Along with plunge-diving, some fledglings and adults practice kleptoparasitism, where they steal prey from other seabirds. Brown boobies have even been observed stealing prey from the normally even more piratical great frigatebirds as they transfer food to their young. Although they are powerful and agile fliers, they are particularly clumsy in takeoffs and landings; they use strong winds and high perches to assist their takeoffs.

=== Vagrancy ===
Sula leucogaster plotus male in flight.

As a result of global warming, the brown booby has increasingly been moving further north into seas formerly too cold for it. The first record in Great Britain was in 2019, with by 2024 a further 15 subsequent records, including six in 2023 and three in 2024; one even reached 59°21'N at North Ronaldsay in Orkney.
