= Smithsonian–Roosevelt African expedition =

1909–10 safari by former U.S. President Theodore Roosevelt

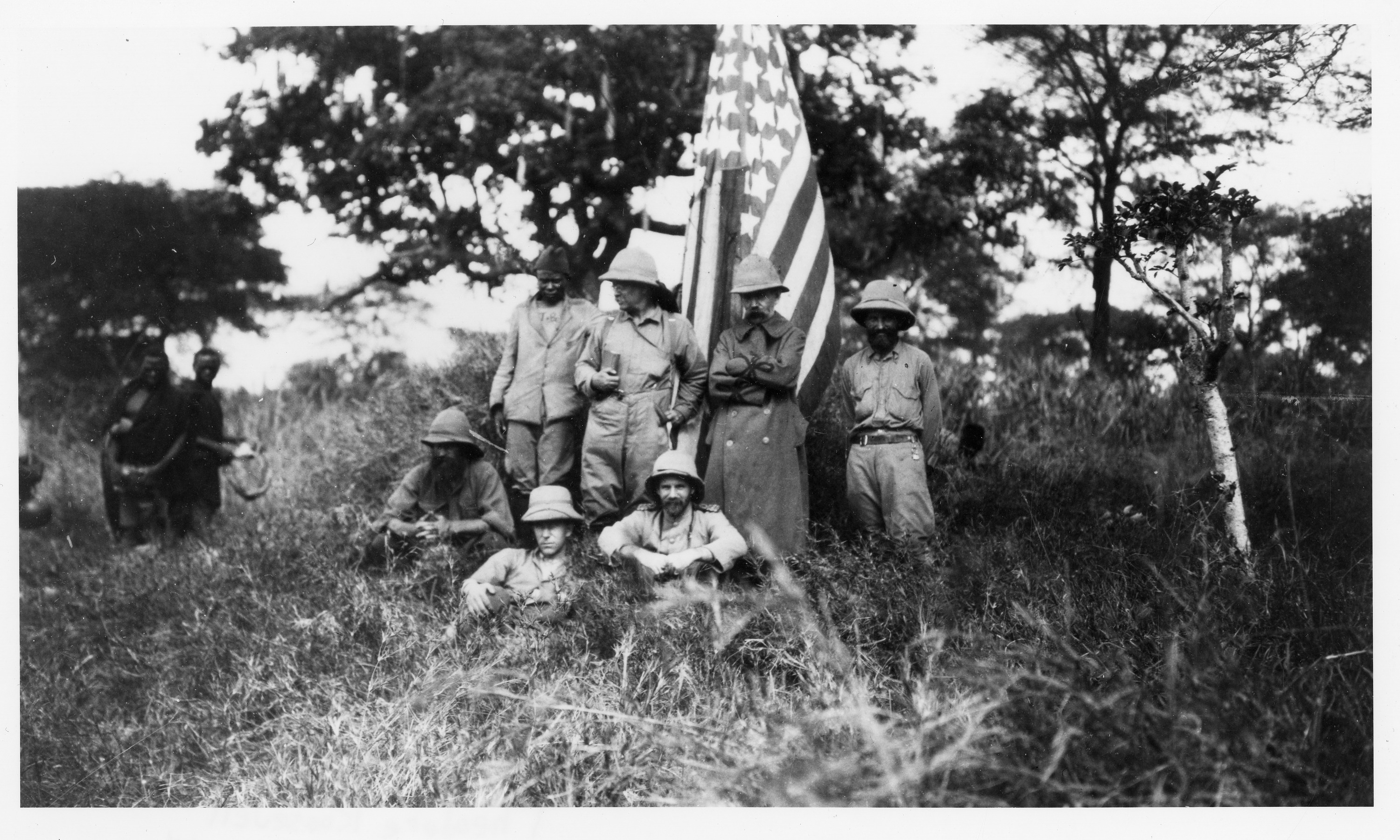
- Participants in the expedition. Smithsonian Institution Archives
- Date: March 1909–June 1910
- Participants: Theodore Roosevelt; R. J. Cunninghame; Frederick Selous; Kermit Roosevelt; Edgar Alexander Mearns; Edmund Heller; John Alden Loring.

The Smithsonian–Roosevelt African expedition was an expedition to tropical Africa in 1909–1910 led by former U.S. President Theodore Roosevelt. It was funded by Andrew Carnegie and sponsored by the Smithsonian Institution. Its purpose was to collect specimens for the Smithsonian's new natural history museum, now known as the National Museum of Natural History. The expedition collected around 11,400 animal specimens, which took Smithsonian naturalists eight years to catalog. The trip involved political and social interactions with local leaders and dignitaries. Following the expedition, Roosevelt chronicled it in his book African Game Trails.

== Participants and resources ==
The group was led by the hunter-tracker R. J. Cunninghame. Participants on the expedition included Australian sharpshooter Leslie Tarlton; three American naturalists, Edgar Alexander Mearns, a retired U.S. Army surgeon; Stanford University taxidermist Edmund Heller, and mammalologist John Alden Loring; and Roosevelt's 19-year-old son Kermit, on a leave of absence from Harvard. The expedition also included a large number of porters, gunbearers, horse boys, tent men, and askari guards, as well as 250 local guides and hunters. Equipment included material for preserving animal hides, including powdered borax, cotton batting, and four tons of salt, as well as a variety of tools, weapons, and other equipment ranging from lanterns to sewing needles. Roosevelt brought a M1903 Springfield in .30-03 caliber and, for larger game, a Winchester 1895 rifle in .405 Winchester. Roosevelt also brought his Pigskin Library, a collection of 59 classic books bound in pig leather and transported in a single reinforced trunk.

== Timeline and route ==
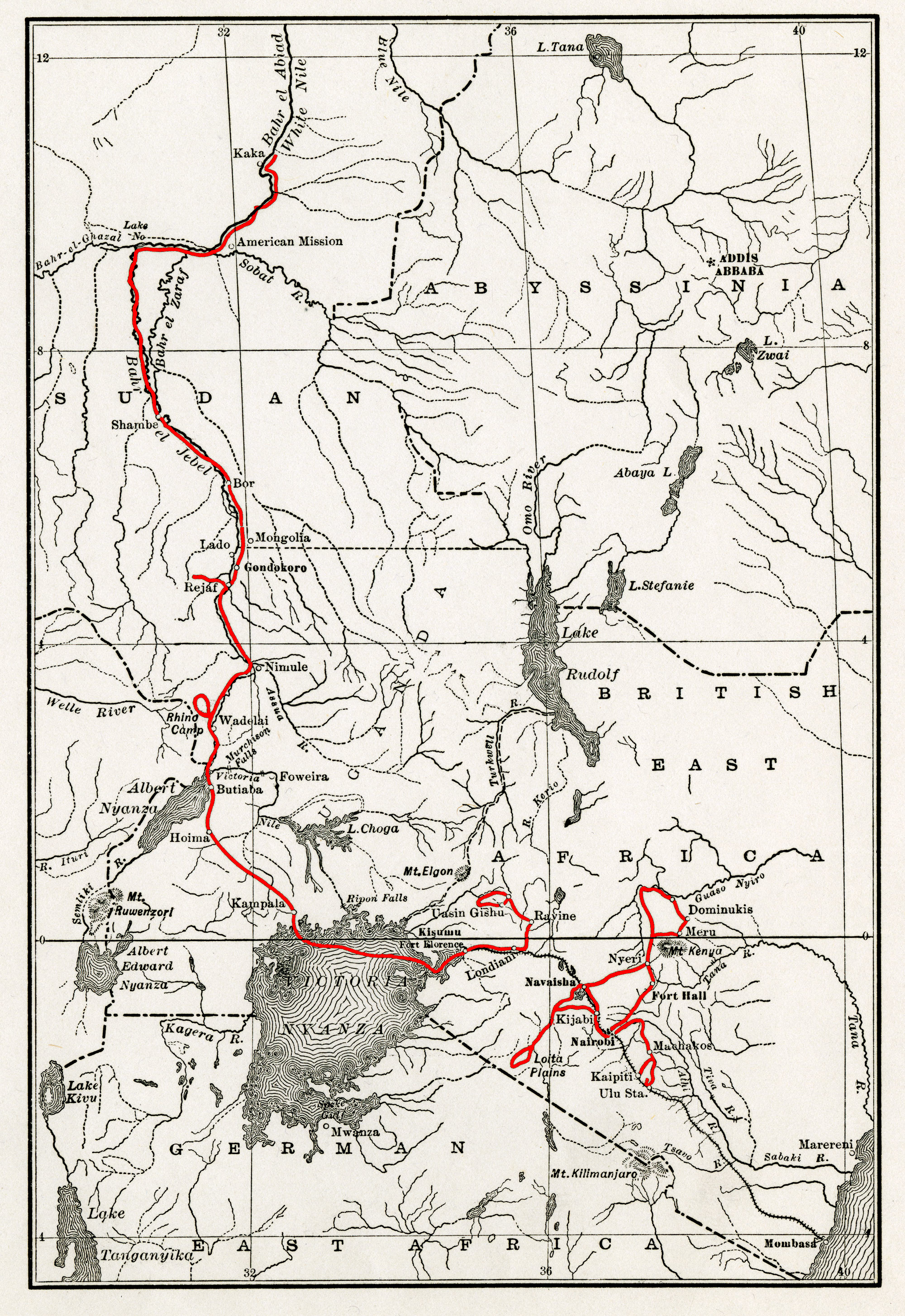
Map of the route taken by the party. From the Edmund Heller Papers, Smithsonian Institution Archives.

The party set sail from New York City on the steamer Hamburg on March 23, 1909, shortly after the end of Roosevelt's presidency on March 4. The Hamburg arrived at its destination at Naples, where the party boarded the Admiral, a German-flagged ship selected because it permitted the expedition to load large quantities of ammunition. While on board the Hamburg, Roosevelt encountered Frederick Courteney Selous, a longtime friend who was traveling to his own African safari, traversing many of the same areas. Throughout the expedition, the party traveled by train and steamboat, and sometimes even horse or camel.

The party landed in Mombasa, British East Africa (now Kenya) on April 21, 1909, and traveled to the Belgian Congo (now Democratic Republic of the Congo) before following the Nile to Khartoum in modern Sudan. Financed by Andrew Carnegie and by his own proposed writings, Roosevelt's party hunted for specimens for the Smithsonian Institution, American Museum of Natural History in New York, and the San Francisco Museum.

Roosevelt returned to the United States in June 1910.

== Results ==
Roosevelt and his companions killed or trapped approximately 11,397 animals. According to Theodore Roosevelt's own tally, the figure included about four thousand birds, two thousand reptiles and amphibians, five hundred fish, and 4,897 mammals (other sources put the figure at 5,103). Combined with marine, land and freshwater shells, crabs, beetles, and other invertebrates, not to mention several thousand plants, the number of natural history specimens totals 23,151. A separate collection was made of ethnographic objects. All of the material took eight years to catalogue. The larger animals that were shot by Theodore and Kermit Roosevelt are listed on pages 457 to 459 of his book African Game Trails. The total is 512, of which 43 are birds. The number of big game animals killed, was 18 lion, 3 leopard, 6 cheetah, 10 hyena, 12 elephant, 10 buffalo, 9 (now very rare) black rhino and 97 white rhino. Most of the 469 larger non big game mammals included 37 species and subspecies of antelopes. The expedition consumed 262 of the animals which were required to provide fresh meat for the large number of porters employed to service the expedition. Tons of salted animals and their skins were shipped to Washington, D.C. The quantity took years to mount, and the Smithsonian shared many duplicate animals with other museums.

Regarding the large number of animals taken, Roosevelt said, "I can be condemned only if the existence of the National Museum, the American Museum of Natural History, and all similar zoological institutions are to be condemned." Some context in considering whether the quantity of animals taken was excessive is that the animals were gathered over a period of ten months and were procured over an area that ranged from Mombasa through Kenya, to Uganda and the South Sudan. The distance traveled, with side trips, was several thousand kilometers. The diversity of larger mammal species collected was such that few individuals of any species were shot in any given area, and the large mammals collected had a negligible impact on the great herds of game that roamed East Africa at that time. Apologists for the Roosevelts have pointed out that the number of each big game species shot was very modest by the standards of the time.

Many hunters of that period, for example, such as Karamoja Bell, had killed over 1,000 elephants each, and the Roosevelts between them killed just eleven. In making that comparison, it must be remembered that the hunters were not collecting specimens for museums but were occasionally employed by landowners to clear animals from land that they wanted to use for plantations and frequently as ivory hunters with or without hunting permits or licenses.

Although the safari was conducted in the name of science, it was as much a political and social event as it was a hunting excursion. Roosevelt interacted with renowned professional hunters and landowning families, and met many native peoples and local leaders, which he contrasted to African Americans, saying: "...it is pleasant to be made to realize in vivid fashion the progress the American negro has made, by comparing him with the negro who dwells in Africa untouched, or but lightly touched, by white influence." Roosevelt became a Life Member of the National Rifle Association of America, as President, in 1907 after he paid a $25 fee. He later wrote a detailed account in the book African Game Trails in which he describes the excitement of the chase, the people he met, and the flora and fauna he collected in the name of science.

Roosevelt greatly enjoyed hunting, but he was also an avid conservationist. In African Game Trails, he condemns "game butchery as objectionable as any form of wanton cruelty and barbarity" although he notes that "to protest against all hunting of game is a sign of softness of head, not of soundness of heart". As a pioneer of wilderness conservation in the US, he fully supported the contemporary British government's attempts to set aside wilderness areas as game reserves, some of the first on the African continent. He notes (page 17) that "in the creation of the great game reserve through which the Uganda railway runs the British Government has conferred a boon upon mankind." Roosevelt helped establish a conservation attitude that eventually resulted in the form of today's game parks in East Africa.

== See also ==
- Roosevelt in Africa (film)
