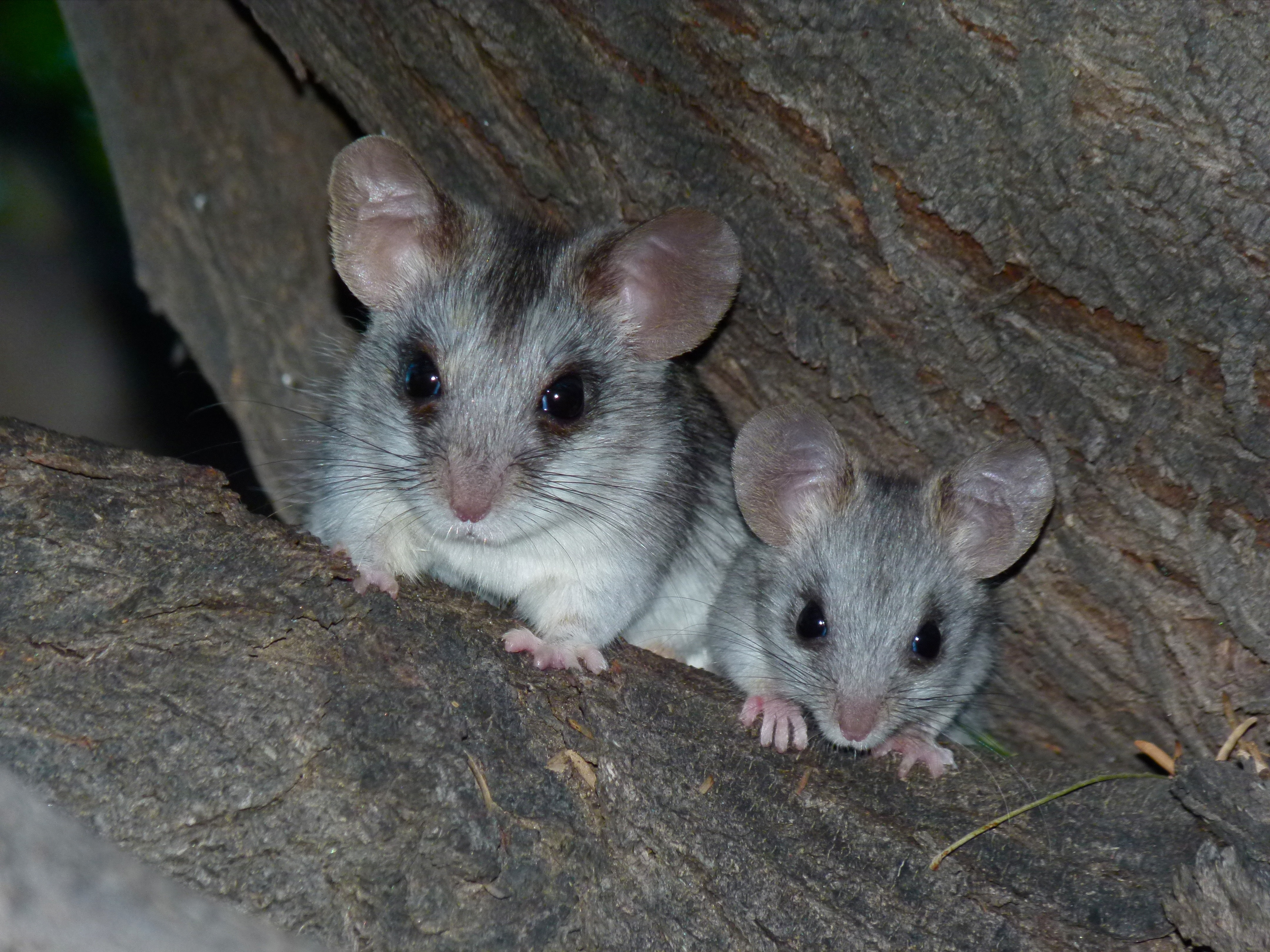
- Adult with young

Conservation status
- Least Concern (IUCN 3.1)

Scientific classification
- Kingdom: Animalia
- Phylum: Chordata
- Class: Mammalia
- Order: Rodentia
- Family: Muridae
- Genus: Thallomys
- Species: T. nigricauda

Binomial name
- Thallomys nigricauda Thomas, 1882
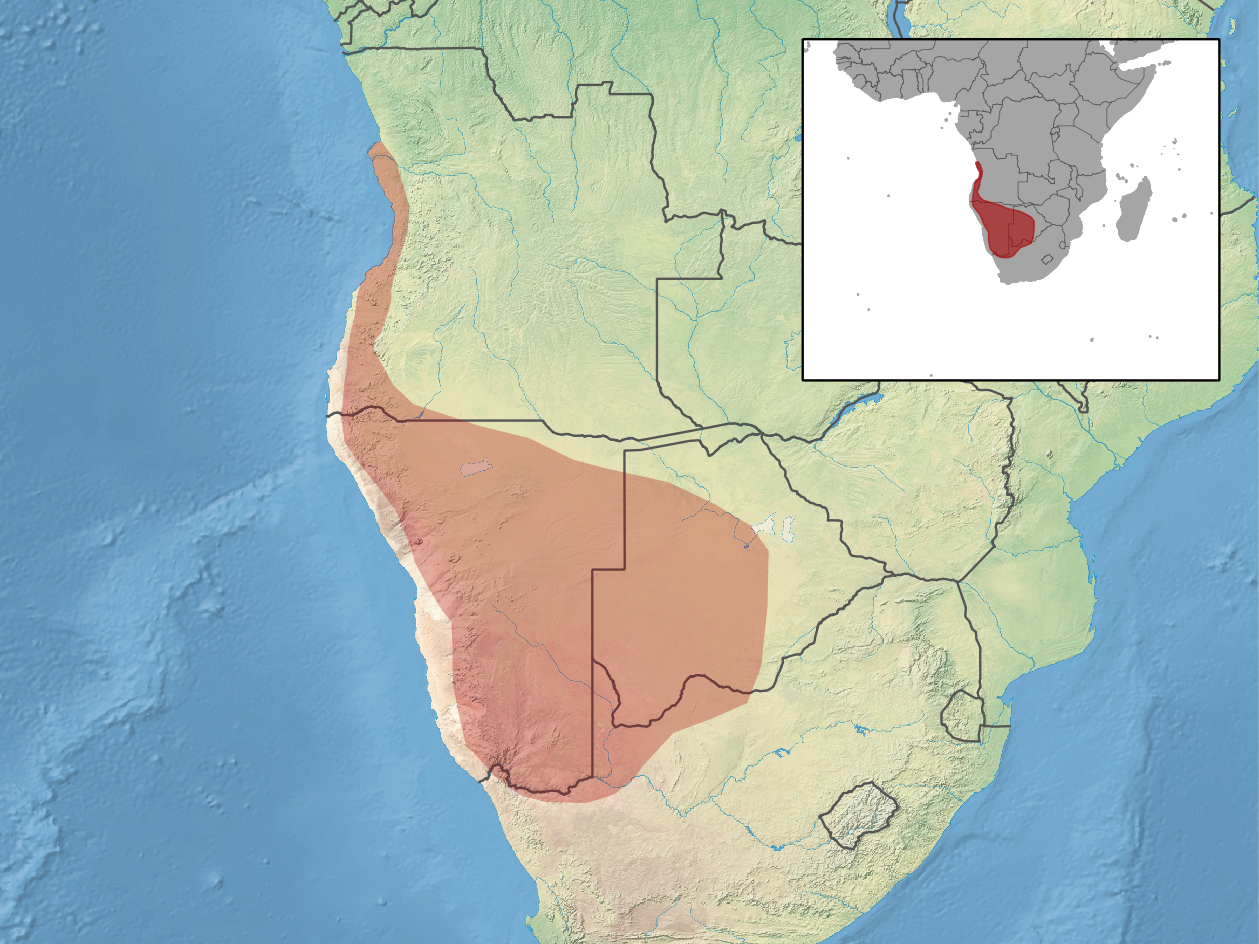

Synonyms
- bradfieldi Roberts, 1933; damarensis (De Winton, 1897); davisi Lundholm, 1955; herero Thomas, 1926; kalaharicus (Dollman, 1911); leuconoe Thomas, 1926; molopensis Roberts, 1933; nitela Thomas and Hinton, 1923; quissamae F. Petter and Beaufort, 1960; robertsi (Ellerman, Morrison-Scott, and Hayman, 1953)

= Black-tailed tree rat =

Species of rodent native to Africa

The black-tailed tree rat, also called black-tailed acacia rat or black-tailed thallomys, (Thallomys nigricauda), is a species of rodent in the family Muridae. It is found in Angola, Botswana, Namibia and South Africa, where its natural habitat is subtropical or tropical dry shrubland. It is both nocturnal and arboreal and makes bulky nests in the trees, often acacias, where it feeds on leaves and buds.

== Description ==
The black-tailed tree rat is a medium-sized rodent with a head-and body length of about 135 mm (5 in) and a tail of about 145 mm (6 in). The sides of the face are grey, and a dark band extends from the muzzle to around the eyes and below the ears. The eyes are large and the whiskers are long. The ears are large, oval, and set at an oblique angle. The dorsal fur is long and woolly, slate grey tinged with yellow. The underparts are white, the limbs are grey and the upper sides of the broad feet are white. The long tail is clad in black scales and black bristles, and tipped with black hairs.

== Distribution and habitat ==
The black-tailed tree rat is endemic to southwestern Africa. Its range includes southwestern Angola, Namibia, Botswana and northwestern South Africa. It inhabits dry savanna, and thorny scrubland with dense patches of woodland or scattered trees such as Vachellia erioloba, Vachellia luederitzii, Vachellia karroo, Euclea pseudebenus, Terminalia sericea, and Boscia albitrunca.

== Ecology ==
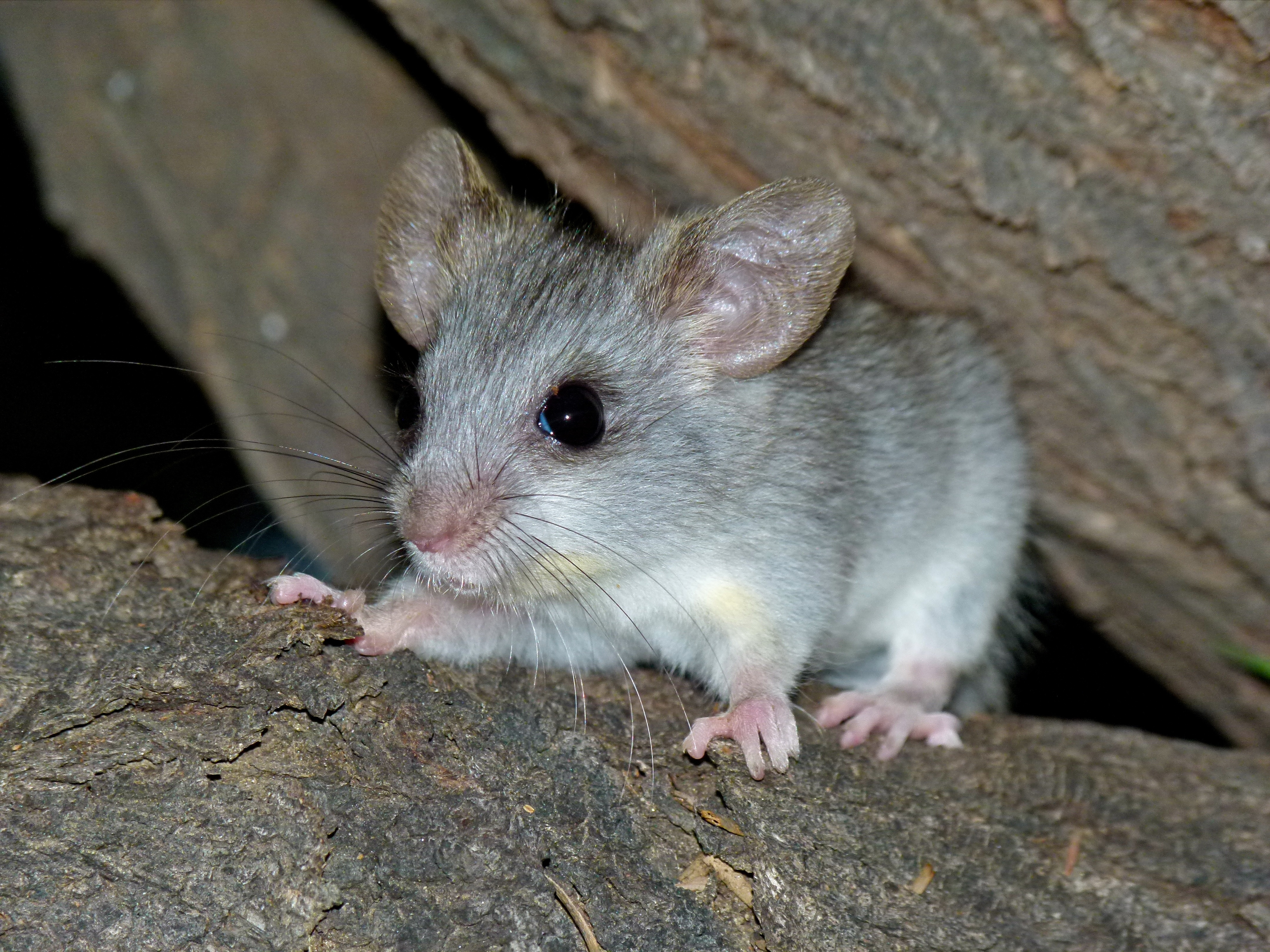

This rat lives in trees and is nocturnal. The broad feet and robust claws make it an agile climber, and it uses its tail for balance as well as prehensilely. It particularly favours Vachellia erioloba trees where there are the crevices and holes it needs for its nest, but it also builds nests in the forks of branches or under slabs of bark; there may be several nests in one tree, not all of them occupied. The nest is a bulky affair of grass, leaves and twigs and may be as much as 30 cm (12 in) deep, with the nesting material overflowing from the cavity. The nest resembles that of the red-billed buffalo weaver but is made of finer material.

Sometimes these rats are solitary while at other times, there may be an individual and several offspring living together. Both males and females have home ranges, the males' ranges being much larger than those of the females. A pair of rats and their offspring may share a nest, moving off at dusk to climb into the canopy where they nibble on young Acacia shoots, or cross into other large trees such as leadwood and mopane to feed. The diet mainly consists of leaves and buds, but also includes the outer layers of Acacia seed pods, occasional insects, and gum that oozes from the branches where the rats create grooves in the bark. The rats are most active in the first few hours of the night and then again in the hours before dawn, and forage in the upper canopy where few other rodents are to be found. It seldom descends to the ground and has no need to drink, deriving sufficient moisture from its food.

== Status ==
The black-tailed tree rat is a common species, has a wide range and is presumed to have a large total population. It faces no particular threats, and the International Union for Conservation of Nature has assessed its conservation status as being of "least concern".
