= Edmund Heller =

American zoologist (1875–1939)

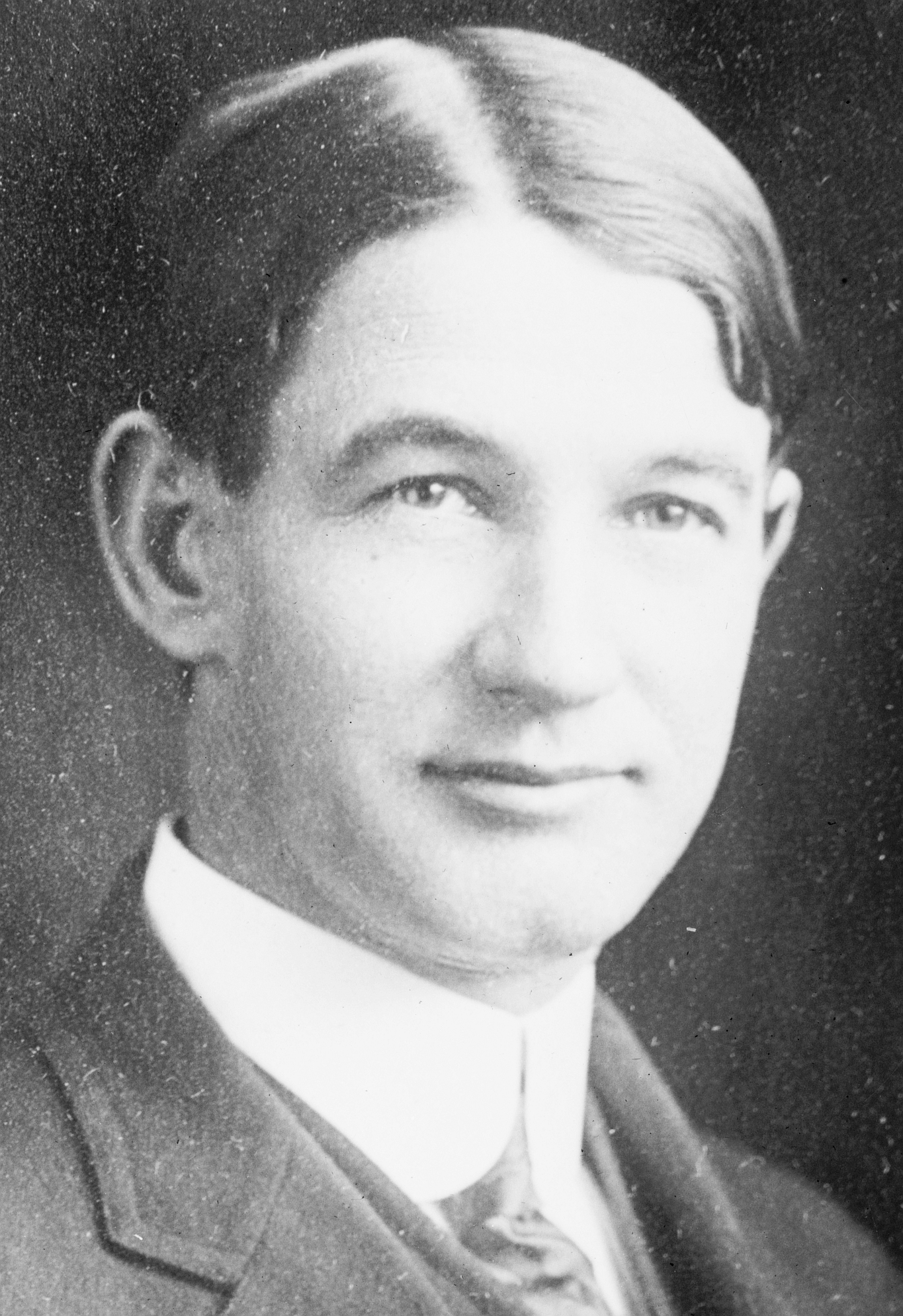
- Born: May 21, 1875; Freeport, Illinois
- Died: July 18, 1939 (aged 64); San Francisco, California
- Education: Stanford University
- Known for: Zoology and African expeditions
- Spouse: Hilda Hempl Heller (m. 1918, div. 1928)
- Scientific career
- Fields: Zoologist
- Workplaces: Museum of Vertebrate Zoology of the University of California; Field Museum of Natural History, Chicago; Washington Park Zoo, Milwaukee; Fleishhacker Zoo, San Francisco

Edmund Heller (May 21, 1875 – July 18, 1939) was an American zoologist. He was President of the Association of Zoos & Aquariums for two terms, 1935–1936 and 1937–1938.

== Early life ==
While at Stanford University, he collected specimens in the Colorado and Mojave Deserts in 1896–1897 before graduating with a degree in zoology in 1901.

== Contributions ==
In 1907, Heller was with Carl Ethan Akeley on the Field Columbian Museum's African expedition. On his return, he was appointed Curator of Mammals at the Museum of Vertebrate Zoology of the University of California and participated in the 1908 Alexander Alaska Expedition.

In 1909, Heller began working with the Smithsonian Institution when he was chosen as a naturalist for large mammals on the Smithsonian–Roosevelt African expedition under the command of former President Theodore Roosevelt. He worked closely with John Alden Loring who worked as a naturalist for the small mammals on the Expedition and they collaborated on their field notes. On his return from the expedition, he co-authored Life Histories of African Game Animals with Roosevelt. Heller also accompanied the Rainey African Expedition of 1911–1912 for the Smithsonian and led the Smithsonian Cape-to-Cairo Expedition of 1919–1920.

At the beginning of the 20th century, Heller led many expeditions to Africa and in 1914 he wrote the book Life-histories of African Game Animals in collaboration with Theodore Roosevelt.

Heller also participated in explorations in Alaska with the Biological Survey, in Peru with Yale University and the National Geographic Society, in China with the American Museum of Natural History, and in Russia with Paul J. Rainey, official photographer to the Czech army in Siberia.

From 1926 to 1928, he was curator of mammals at the Field Museum of Natural History in Chicago.

Edmund Heller was the director of the Washington Park Zoo in Milwaukee (from 1928 to 1935). In 1933, Heller proposed displaying animals from the same geographic region together. He placed four young wolves, three black bear cubs, and four polar bear cubs in one enclosure. Tragically, the polar bears drowned the black bears, leading to Heller's criticism and eventual departure from the zoo.

He moved on to direct the Fleishhacker Zoo in San Francisco from 1935 until his death in 1939, during which time he was also the president of the Association of Zoos and Aquariums (AZA).

Species and subspecies which were named in honor of Heller include the Southern Pacific rattlesnake (Crotalus helleri), Heller's coral snake (Micrurus lemniscatus helleri), a skink (Panaspis helleri), the red-necked keelback (Rhabdophis subminiatus helleri), the Taita thrush (Turdus helleri), and the puna thistletail (Schizoeaca helleri).

== Popular culture ==
- Heller, played by Paul Birchard, appears in the TV series The Young Indiana Jones in an episode featuring the Smithsonian African expedition (1909–1910).

== Literature ==
- Heller, Edmund (1925). Captain Marshall Field Central African Expedition, 1925. Field Museum of Natural History. (Heller's field notebook).
- Heller, Edmund (1926). Captain Marshall Field Central African Expedition, 1926. Field Museum of Natural History. (Heller's field notebook).

== Taxon described by him ==
- Category:Taxa named by Edmund Heller

== Taxon named in his honor ==
- Rhabdophis helleri
- Anchoa helleri (Hubbs 1921)
- Hemibrycon helleri Eigenmann 1927
- Sphyraena helleri Jenkins 1901
