= John Alden Loring =

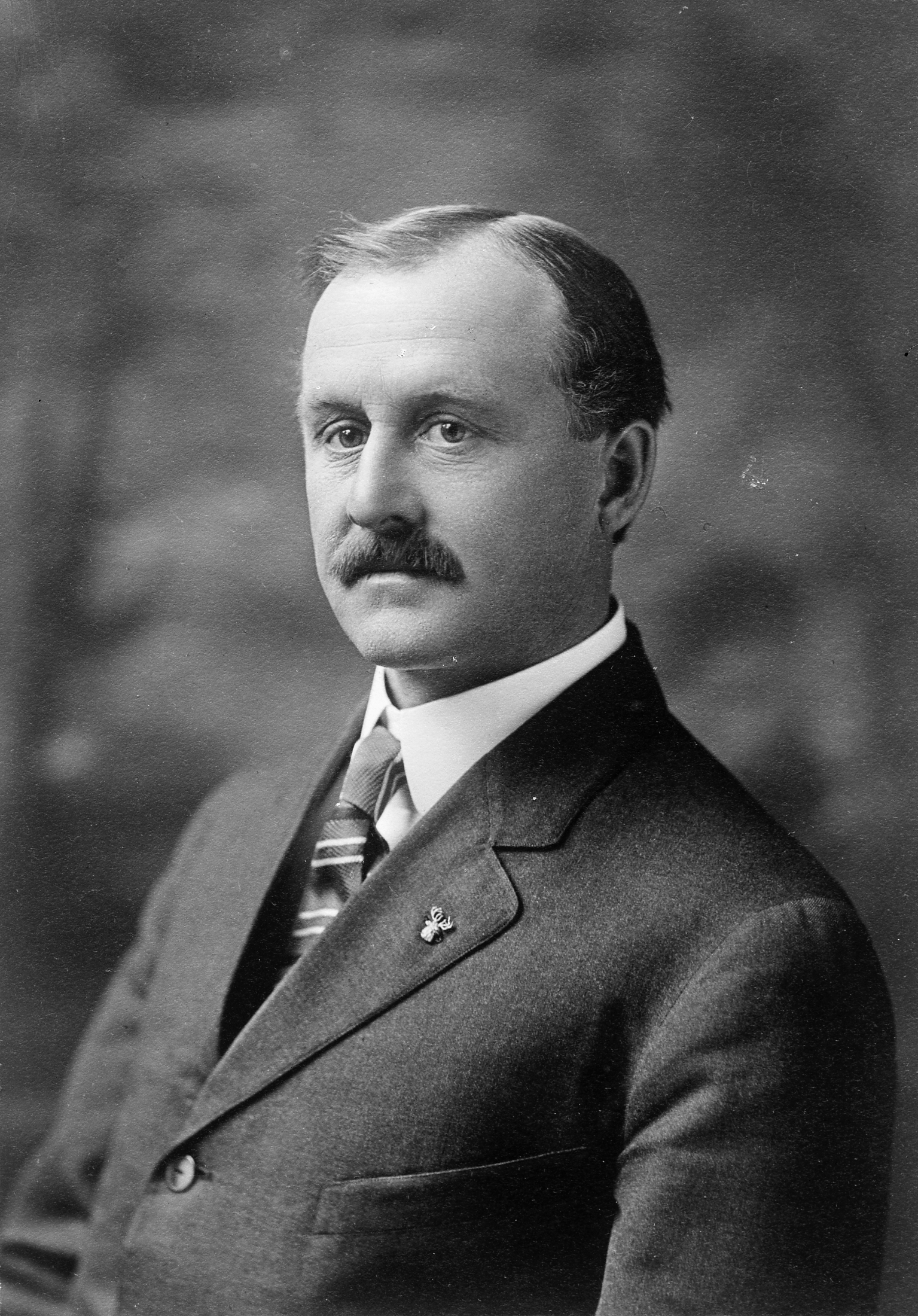
- Born: March 31, 1871
- Died: May 8, 1947 (aged 76)
- Citizenship: USA
- Known for: collecting and documenting species of mammals
- Scientific career
- Fields: Mammalogy, natural history

John Alden Loring (March 31, 1871 – May 8, 1947) was a mammalogist and field naturalist who served with the Bureau of Biological Survey, United States Department of Agriculture, the Bronx Zoological Park, the Smithsonian Institution and numerous expeditions collecting specimens in North America, Europe and Africa. A voluminous and careful traveling collector, Loring was recognized early in his career for 900 specimens collected, prepared and sent to the United States National Museum over a three-month period during an 1898 expedition through Scandinavia and northwestern Europe.

Loring's work and professional relationships spanned several continents focusing on collecting and documenting species of mammals. He served on the Smithsonian-Roosevelt African Expedition (1909–1910) as the Smithsonian specialist designated to preserve small mammals collected during the year-long expedition. In 1916, he was sent as a joint envoy of the New York Zoological Park, Philadelphia Zoological Gardens and the National Zoological Park to South Africa to collect animals and if possible to arrange for a supply of future living specimens.

Loring's personal papers are held by the Smithsonian Institution Archives. His collection of field books are part of the Smithsonian's Field Book Registry.

Loring's rat was named for him (Heller, 1909).

== Publications ==
- Loring, J. Alden (John Alden). African Adventure Stories. New York, New York. C. Scribner's sons. 1914.
- Loring, J. Alden (John Alden), 1871-1947: Young Folks' Nature Field Book (Boston, D. Estes and Co., c1906)
