= List of mammals of Malawi =

This is a list of the mammal species recorded in Malawi. There are 192 mammal species in Malawi, of which one is critically endangered, two are endangered, four are vulnerable, and eleven are near threatened.

The following tags are used to highlight each species' conservation status as assessed by the International Union for Conservation of Nature:

EX	Extinct	No reasonable doubt that the last individual has died.
EW	Extinct in the wild	Known only to survive in captivity or as a naturalized populations well outside its previous range.
CR	Critically endangered	The species is in imminent risk of extinction in the wild.
EN	Endangered	The species is facing an extremely high risk of extinction in the wild.
VU	Vulnerable	The species is facing a high risk of extinction in the wild.
NT	Near threatened	The species does not meet any of the criteria that would categorise it as risking extinction but it is likely to do so in the future.
LC	Least concern	There are no current identifiable risks to the species.
DD	Data deficient	There is inadequate information to make an assessment of the risks to this species.

Some species were assessed using an earlier set of criteria. Species assessed using this system have the following instead of near threatened and least concern categories:

LR/cd	Lower risk/conservation dependent	Species which were the focus of conservation programmes and may have moved into a higher risk category if that programme was discontinued.
LR/nt	Lower risk/near threatened	Species which are close to being classified as vulnerable but are not the subject of conservation programmes.
LR/lc	Lower risk/least concern	Species for which there are no identifiable risks.

== Order: Macroscelidea (elephant-shrews) ==
Often called sengis, the elephant shrews or jumping shrews are native to southern Africa. Their common English name derives from their elongated flexible snout and their resemblance to the true shrews.

- Family: Macroscelididae (elephant-shrews)
  - Genus: Elephantulus
    - Short-snouted elephant shrew, Elephantulus brachyrhynchus LC
    - Dusky elephant shrew, Elephantulus fuscus DD
  - Genus: Petrodromus
    - Four-toed elephant shrew, Petrodromus tetradactylus LC
  - Genus: Rhynchocyon
    - Checkered elephant shrew, R. cirnei LC

== Order: Tubulidentata (aardvarks) ==
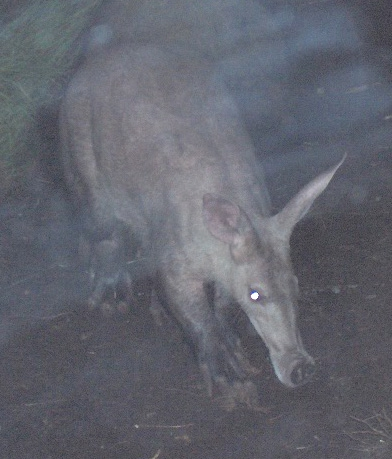
Aardvark

The order Tubulidentata consists of a single species, the aardvark. Tubulidentata are characterised by their teeth which lack a pulp cavity and form thin tubes which are continuously worn down and replaced.

- Family: Orycteropodidae
  - Genus: Orycteropus
    - Aardvark, O. afer LC

== Order: Hyracoidea (hyraxes) ==
The hyraxes are any of four species of fairly small, thickset, herbivorous mammals in the order Hyracoidea. About the size of a domestic cat they are well-furred, with rounded bodies and a stumpy tail. They are native to Africa and the Middle East.

- Family: Procaviidae (hyraxes)
  - Genus: Heterohyrax
    - Yellow-spotted rock hyrax, Heterohyrax brucei LC

== Order: Proboscidea (elephants) ==
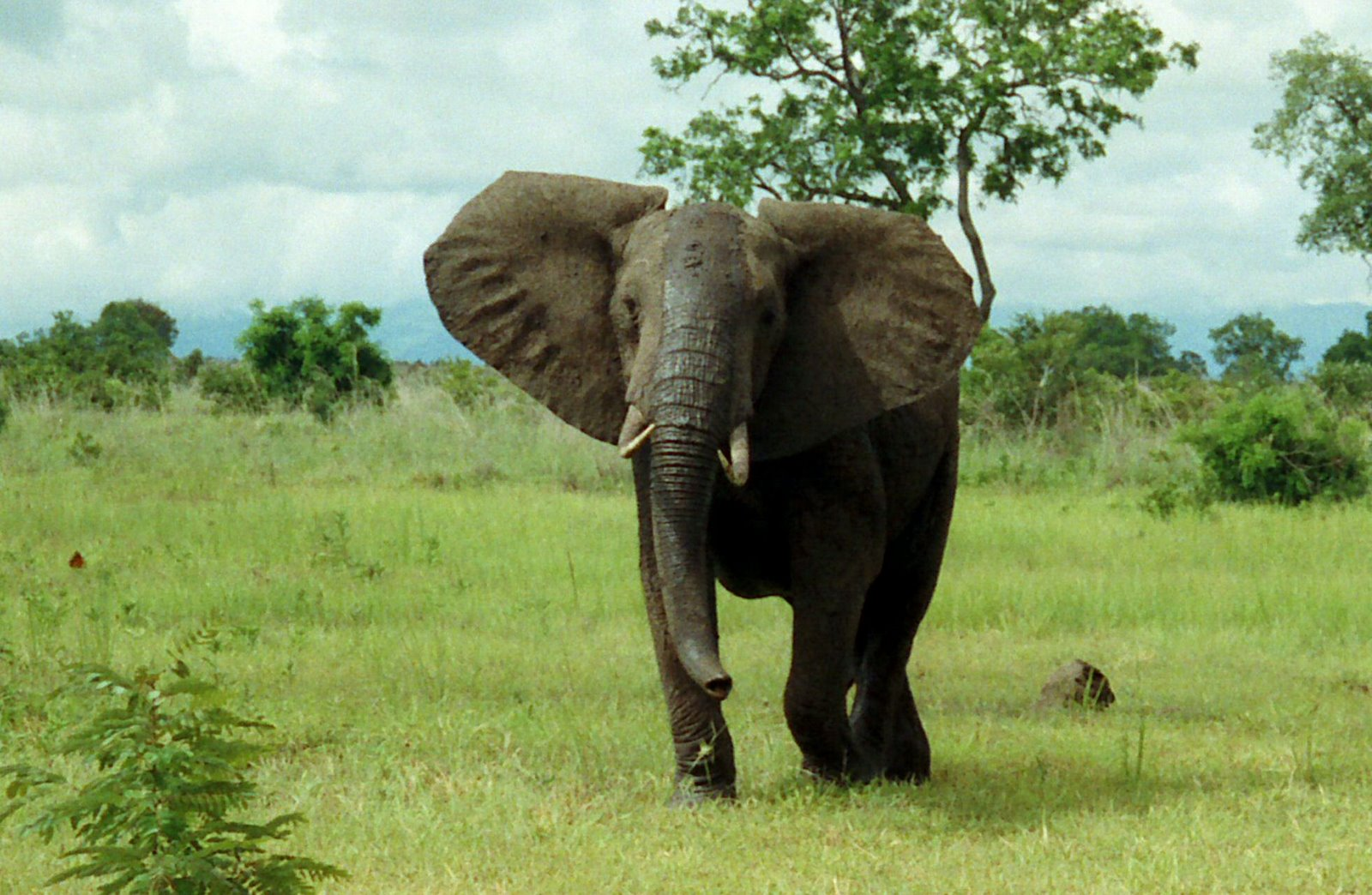
African bush elephant

The elephants comprise three living species and are the largest living land animals.

- Family: Elephantidae (elephants)
  - Genus: Loxodonta
    - African bush elephant, L. africana EN

== Order: Primates ==
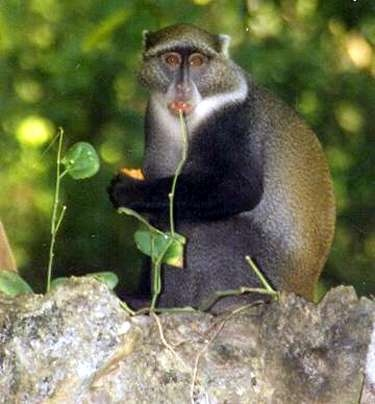
Blue monkey

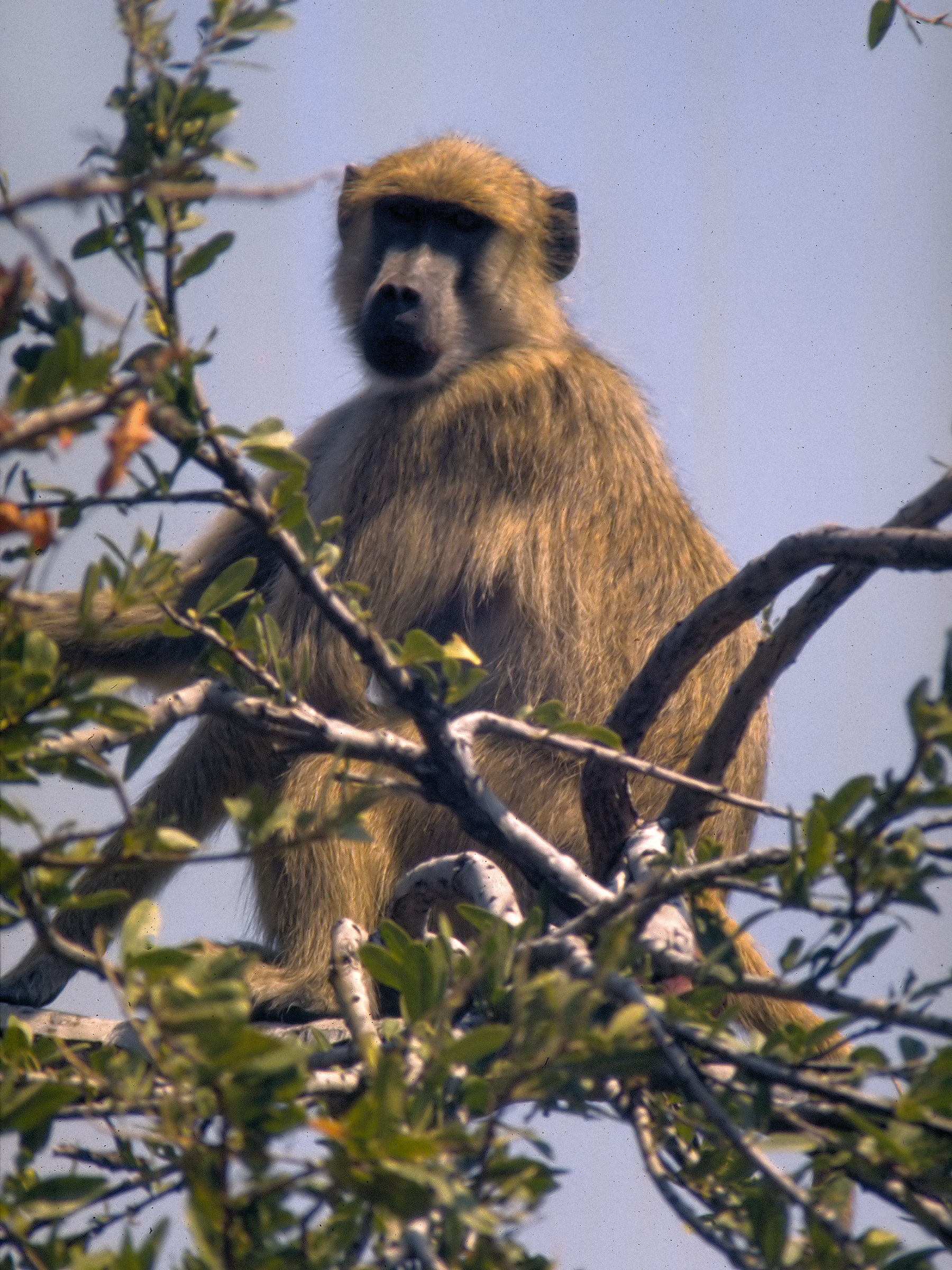
Chacma baboon

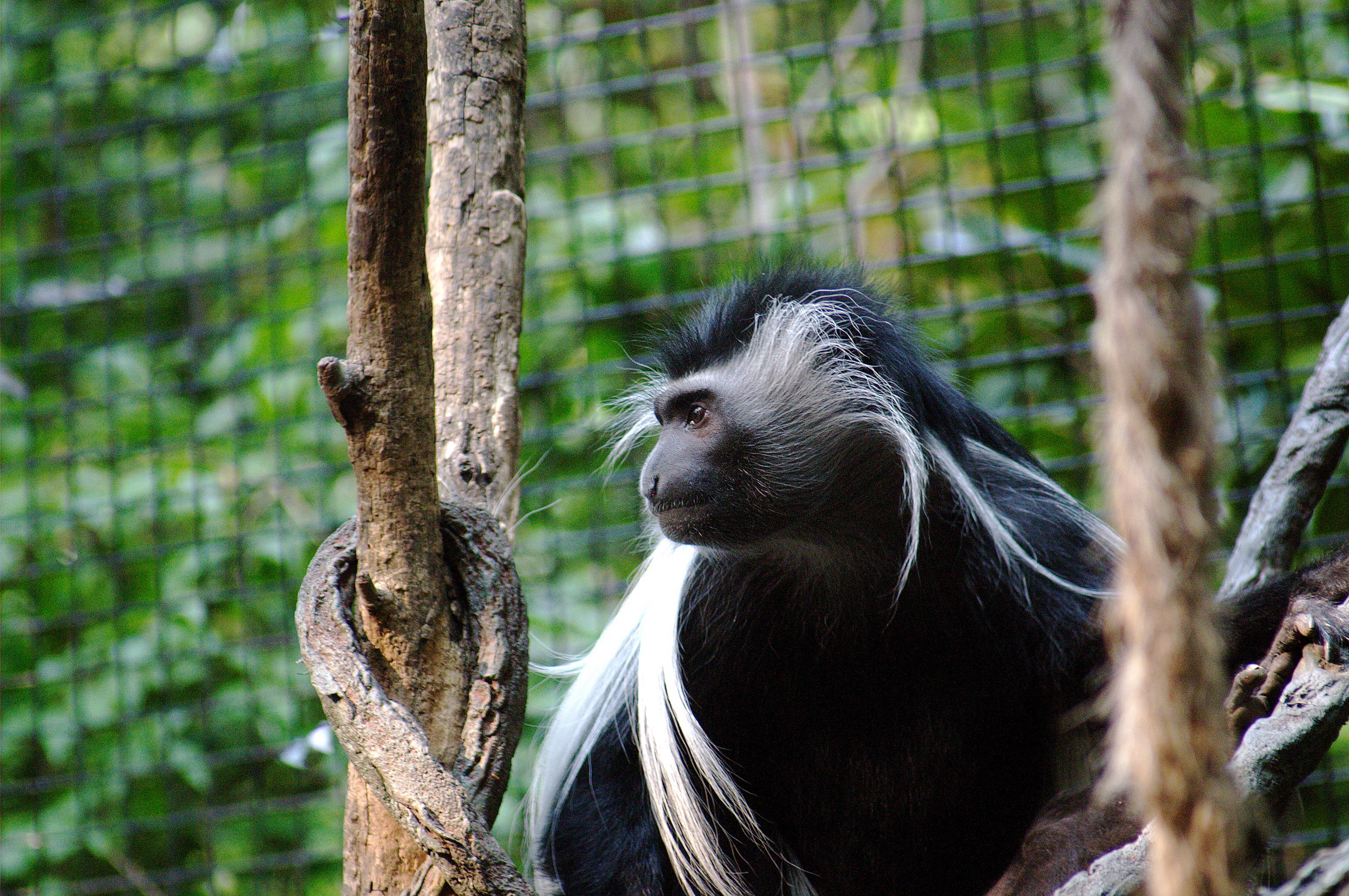
Angola colobus

The order Primates contains humans and their closest relatives: lemurs, lorisoids, tarsiers, monkeys, and apes.

- Suborder: Strepsirrhini
  - Infraorder: Lemuriformes
    - Superfamily: Lorisoidea
      - Family: Galagidae
        - Genus: Galago
          - Mohol bushbaby, Galago moholi LR/lc
        - Genus: Galagoides
          - Prince Demidoff's bushbaby, Galagoides demidovii LR/lc
          - Grant's bushbaby, Galagoides granti DD
          - Malawi bushbaby, Galagoides nyasae DD
          - Thomas's bushbaby, Galagoides thomasi LR/lc
          - Zanzibar bushbaby, Galagoides zanzibaricus LR/nt
        - Genus: Otolemur
          - Brown greater galago, Otolemur crassicaudatus LR/lc
- Suborder: Haplorhini
  - Infraorder: Simiiformes
    - Parvorder: Catarrhini
      - Superfamily: Cercopithecoidea
        - Family: Cercopithecidae (Old World monkeys)
          - Genus: Chlorocebus
            - Vervet monkey, Chlorocebus pygerythrus LR/lc
          - Genus: Cercopithecus
            - Blue monkey, Cercopithecus mitis LR/lc
          - Genus: Papio
            - Yellow baboon, Papio cynocephalus LR/lc
            - Chacma baboon, Papio ursinus LR/lc
          - Subfamily: Colobinae
            - Genus: Colobus
              - Angola colobus, Colobus angolensis LR/lc

== Order: Rodentia (rodents) ==
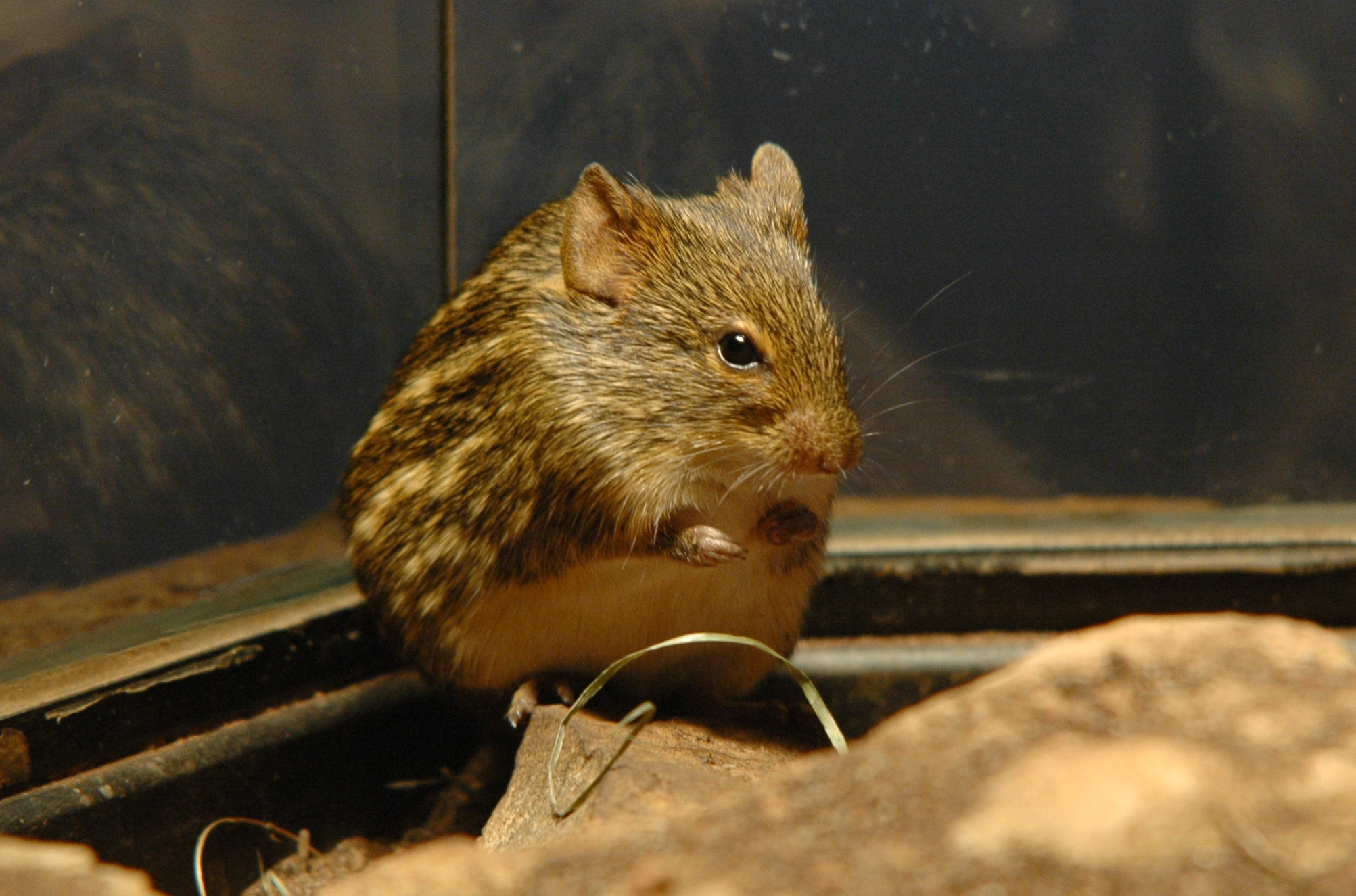
Typical striped grass mouse

Rodents make up the largest order of mammals, with over 40% of mammalian species. They have two incisors in the upper and lower jaw which grow continually and must be kept short by gnawing. Most rodents are small though the capybara can weigh up to 45 kg (99 lb).

- Suborder: Hystricognathi
  - Family: Bathyergidae
    - Genus: Cryptomys
      - Common mole-rat, Cryptomys hottentotus LC
      - Mechow's mole-rat, Cryptomys mechowi LC
    - Genus: Heliophobius
      - Silvery mole-rat, Heliophobius argenteocinereus LC
  - Family: Hystricidae (Old World porcupines)
    - Genus: Hystrix
      - Cape porcupine, Hystrix africaeaustralis LC
  - Family: Thryonomyidae (cane rats)
    - Genus: Thryonomys
      - Lesser cane rat, Thryonomys gregorianus LC
- Suborder: Sciurognathi
  - Family: Anomaluridae
    - Subfamily: Anomalurinae
      - Genus: Anomalurus
        - Lord Derby's scaly-tailed squirrel, Anomalurus derbianus LC
  - Family: Sciuridae (squirrels)
    - Subfamily: Xerinae
      - Tribe: Protoxerini
        - Genus: Heliosciurus
          - Mutable sun squirrel, Heliosciurus mutabilis LC
        - Genus: Paraxerus
          - Smith's bush squirrel, Paraxerus cepapi LC
          - Striped bush squirrel, Paraxerus flavovittis DD
          - Black and red bush squirrel, Paraxerus lucifer DD
          - Red bush squirrel, Paraxerus palliatus LC
  - Family: Gliridae (dormice)
    - Subfamily: Graphiurinae
      - Genus: Graphiurus
        - Johnston's African dormouse, Graphiurus johnstoni DD
        - Small-eared dormouse, Graphiurus microtis LC
  - Family: Nesomyidae
    - Subfamily: Dendromurinae
      - Genus: Dendromus
        - Gray climbing mouse, Dendromus melanotis LC
        - Brants's climbing mouse, Dendromus mesomelas LC
        - Chestnut climbing mouse, Dendromus mystacalis LC
        - Nyika climbing mouse, Dendromus nyikae LC
      - Genus: Steatomys
        - Fat mouse, Steatomys pratensis LC
    - Subfamily: Cricetomyinae
      - Genus: Beamys
        - Greater hamster-rat, Beamys major NT
      - Genus: Cricetomys
        - Gambian pouched rat, Cricetomys gambianus LC
      - Genus: Saccostomus
        - South African pouched mouse, Saccostomus campestris LC
  - Family: Muridae (mice, rats, voles, gerbils, hamsters, etc.)
    - Subfamily: Deomyinae
      - Genus: Acomys
        - Spiny mouse, Acomys spinosissimus LC
      - Genus: Lophuromys
        - Yellow-spotted brush-furred rat, Lophuromys flavopunctatus LC
      - Genus: Uranomys
        - Rudd's mouse, Uranomys ruddi LC
    - Subfamily: Otomyinae
      - Genus: Otomys
        - Angoni vlei rat, Otomys angoniensis LC
        - Dent's vlei rat, Otomys denti NT
        - Tanzanian vlei rat, Otomys lacustris NT
        - Uzungwe vlei rat, Otomys uzungwensis EN
    - Subfamily: Gerbillinae
      - Genus: Tatera
        - Boehm's gerbil, Tatera boehmi LC
        - Bushveld gerbil, Tatera leucogaster LC
    - Subfamily: Murinae
      - Genus: Aethomys
        - Red rock rat, Aethomys chrysophilus LC
        - Kaiser's rock rat, Aethomys kaiseri LC
        - Namaqua rock rat, Aethomys namaquensis LC
        - Nyika rock rat, Aethomys nyikae LC
      - Genus: Arvicanthis
        - African grass rat, Arvicanthis niloticus LC
      - Genus: Dasymys
        - African marsh rat, Dasymys incomtus LC
      - Genus: Grammomys
        - Woodland thicket rat, Grammomys dolichurus LC
        - Ruwenzori thicket rat, Grammomys ibeanus LC
      - Genus: Hylomyscus
        - Montane wood mouse, Hylomyscus denniae LC
      - Genus: Lemniscomys
        - Single-striped grass mouse, Lemniscomys rosalia LC
        - Typical striped grass mouse, Lemniscomys striatus LC
      - Genus: Mastomys
        - Natal multimammate mouse, Mastomys natalensis LC
      - Genus: Mus
        - African pygmy mouse, Mus minutoides LC
        - Gray-bellied pygmy mouse, Mus triton LC
      - Genus: Mylomys
        - African groove-toothed rat, Mylomys dybowskii LC
      - Genus: Pelomys
        - Creek groove-toothed swamp rat, Pelomys fallax LC
      - Genus: Praomys
        - Delectable soft-furred mouse, Praomys delectorum NT
      - Genus: Rhabdomys
        - Four-striped grass mouse, Rhabdomys pumilio LC
      - Genus: Thallomys
        - Acacia rat, Thallomys paedulcus LC
      - Genus: Zelotomys
        - Hildegarde's broad-headed mouse, Zelotomys hildegardeae LC

== Order: Lagomorpha (lagomorphs) ==
The lagomorphs comprise two families, Leporidae (hares and rabbits), and Ochotonidae (pikas). Though they can resemble rodents, and were classified as a superfamily in that order until the early 20th century, they have since been considered a separate order. They differ from rodents in a number of physical characteristics, such as having four incisors in the upper jaw rather than two.

- Family: Leporidae (rabbits, hares)
  - Genus: Pronolagus
    - Smith's red rock hare, Pronolagus rupestris LR/lc
    - African savanna hare, Lepus microtis LR/lc

== Order: Erinaceomorpha (hedgehogs and gymnures) ==
The order Erinaceomorpha contains a single family, Erinaceidae, which comprise the hedgehogs and gymnures. The hedgehogs are easily recognised by their spines while gymnures look more like large rats.

- Family: Erinaceidae (hedgehogs)
  - Subfamily: Erinaceinae
    - Genus: Atelerix
      - Four-toed hedgehog, Atelerix albiventris LR/lc

== Order: Soricomorpha (shrews, moles, and solenodons) ==
The "shrew-forms" are insectivorous mammals. The shrews and solenodons closely resemble mice while the moles are stout-bodied burrowers.

- Family: Soricidae (shrews)
  - Subfamily: Crocidurinae
    - Genus: Crocidura
      - Reddish-gray musk shrew, Crocidura cyanea LC
      - Bicolored musk shrew, Crocidura fuscomurina LC
      - Lesser red musk shrew, Crocidura hirta LC
      - Moonshine shrew, Crocidura luna LC
      - Lesser gray-brown musk shrew, Crocidura silacea LC
      - Turbo shrew, Crocidura turba LC
    - Genus: Suncus
      - Greater dwarf shrew, Suncus lixus LC
      - Lesser dwarf shrew, Suncus varilla LC
    - Genus: Sylvisorex
      - Climbing shrew, Sylvisorex megalura LC

== Order: Chiroptera (bats) ==
The bats' most distinguishing feature is that their forelimbs are developed as wings, making them the only mammals capable of flight. Bat species account for about 20% of all mammals.

- Family: Pteropodidae (flying foxes, Old World fruit bats)
  - Subfamily: Pteropodinae
    - Genus: Eidolon
      - Straw-coloured fruit bat, Eidolon helvum LC
    - Genus: Epomophorus
      - Peters's epauletted fruit bat, Epomophorus crypturus LC
      - Ethiopian epauletted fruit bat, Epomophorus labiatus LC
      - Wahlberg's epauletted fruit bat, Epomophorus wahlbergi LC
    - Genus: Epomops
      - Dobson's epauletted fruit bat, Epomops dobsoni LC
    - Genus: Plerotes
      - D'Anchieta's fruit bat, Plerotes anchietae DD
    - Genus: Rousettus
      - Egyptian fruit bat, Rousettus aegyptiacus LC
      - Long-haired rousette, Rousettus lanosus LC
- Family: Vespertilionidae
  - Subfamily: Kerivoulinae
    - Genus: Kerivoula
      - Damara woolly bat, Kerivoula argentata LC
      - Lesser woolly bat, Kerivoula lanosa LC
  - Subfamily: Myotinae
    - Genus: Myotis
      - Rufous mouse-eared bat, Myotis bocagii LC
      - Cape hairy bat, Myotis tricolor LC
      - Welwitsch's bat, Myotis welwitschii LC
  - Subfamily: Vespertilioninae
    - Genus: Eptesicus
      - Long-tailed house bat, Eptesicus hottentotus LC
    - Genus: Glauconycteris
      - Silvered bat, Glauconycteris argentata LC
      - Butterfly bat, Glauconycteris variegata LC
    - Genus: Laephotis
      - Botswanan long-eared bat, Laephotis botswanae LC
    - Genus: Neoromicia
      - Cape serotine, Neoromicia capensis LC
      - Yellow serotine, Neoromicia flavescens DD
      - Melck's house bat, Neoromicia melckorum DD
      - Banana pipistrelle, Neoromicia nanus LC
      - Rendall's serotine, Neoromicia rendalli LC
      - Somali serotine, Neoromicia somalicus LC
      - Zulu serotine, Neoromicia zuluensis LC
    - Genus: Nycticeinops
      - Schlieffen's bat, Nycticeinops schlieffeni LC
    - Genus: Pipistrellus
      - Rüppell's pipistrelle, Pipistrellus rueppelli LC
      - Rusty pipistrelle, Pipistrellus rusticus LC
    - Genus: Scotoecus
      - White-bellied lesser house bat, Scotoecus albigula DD
      - Light-winged lesser house bat, Scotoecus albofuscus DD
      - Hinde's lesser house bat, Scotoecus hindei DD
      - Dark-winged lesser house bat, Scotoecus hirundo DD
    - Genus: Scotophilus
      - African yellow bat, Scotophilus dinganii LC
      - Schreber's yellow bat, Scotophilus nigrita NT
      - Greenish yellow bat, Scotophilus viridis LC
  - Subfamily: Miniopterinae
    - Genus: Miniopterus
      - Lesser long-fingered bat, Miniopterus fraterculus LC
      - Natal long-fingered bat, Miniopterus natalensis NT
- Family: Molossidae
  - Genus: Chaerephon
    - Nigerian free-tailed bat, Chaerephon nigeriae LC
    - Little free-tailed bat, Chaerephon pumila LC
  - Genus: Mops
    - Angolan free-tailed bat, Mops condylurus LC
    - Midas free-tailed bat, Mops midas LC
  - Genus: Otomops
    - Large-eared free-tailed bat, Otomops martiensseni NT
  - Genus: Tadarida
    - Madagascan large free-tailed bat, Tadarida fulminans LC
    - African giant free-tailed bat, Tadarida ventralis NT
- Family: Emballonuridae
  - Genus: Taphozous
    - Mauritian tomb bat, Taphozous mauritianus LC
- Family: Nycteridae
  - Genus: Nycteris
    - Large slit-faced bat, Nycteris grandis LC
    - Hairy slit-faced bat, Nycteris hispida LC
    - Large-eared slit-faced bat, Nycteris macrotis LC
    - Egyptian slit-faced bat, Nycteris thebaica LC
    - Wood's slit-faced bat, Nycteris woodi NT
- Family: Megadermatidae
  - Genus: Lavia
    - Yellow-winged bat, Lavia frons LC
- Family: Rhinolophidae
  - Subfamily: Rhinolophinae
    - Genus: Rhinolophus
      - Blasius's horseshoe bat, R. blasii LC
      - Geoffroy's horseshoe bat, Rhinolophus clivosus LC
      - Darling's horseshoe bat, Rhinolophus darlingi LC
      - Rüppell's horseshoe bat, Rhinolophus fumigatus LC
      - Hildebrandt's horseshoe bat, Rhinolophus hildebrandti LC
      - Lander's horseshoe bat, Rhinolophus landeri LC
      - Bushveld horseshoe bat, Rhinolophus simulator LC
  - Subfamily: Hipposiderinae
    - Genus: Hipposideros
      - Sundevall's roundleaf bat, Hipposideros caffer LC
      - Noack's roundleaf bat, Hipposideros ruber LC
    - Genus: Triaenops
      - Persian trident bat, Triaenops persicus LC

== Order: Pholidota (pangolins) ==
The order Pholidota comprises the eight species of pangolin. Pangolins are anteaters and have the powerful claws, elongated snout and long tongue seen in the other unrelated anteater species.

- Family: Manidae
  - Genus: Smutsia
    - Ground pangolin, S. temminckii VU

== Order: Carnivora (carnivorans) ==
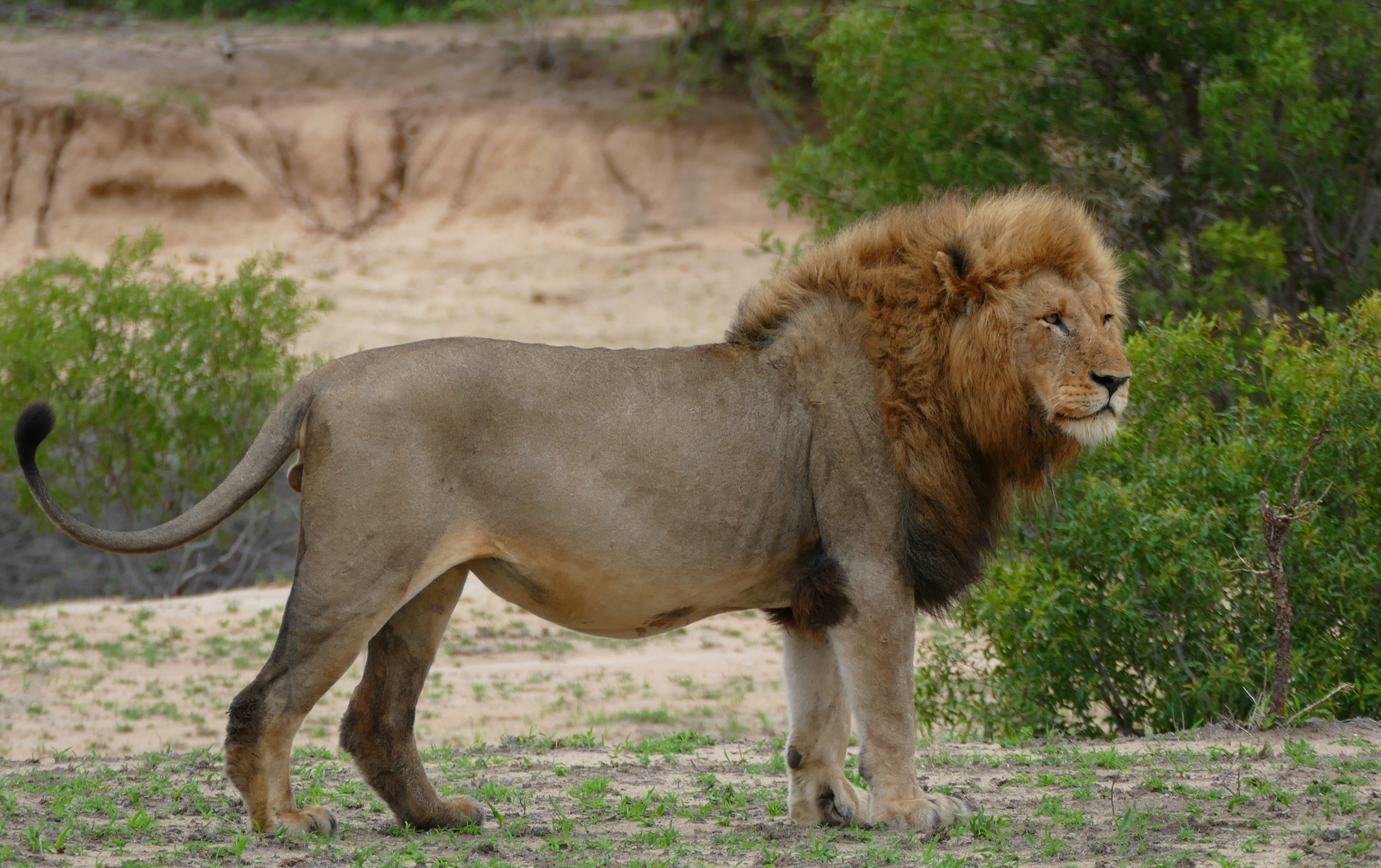
Lion

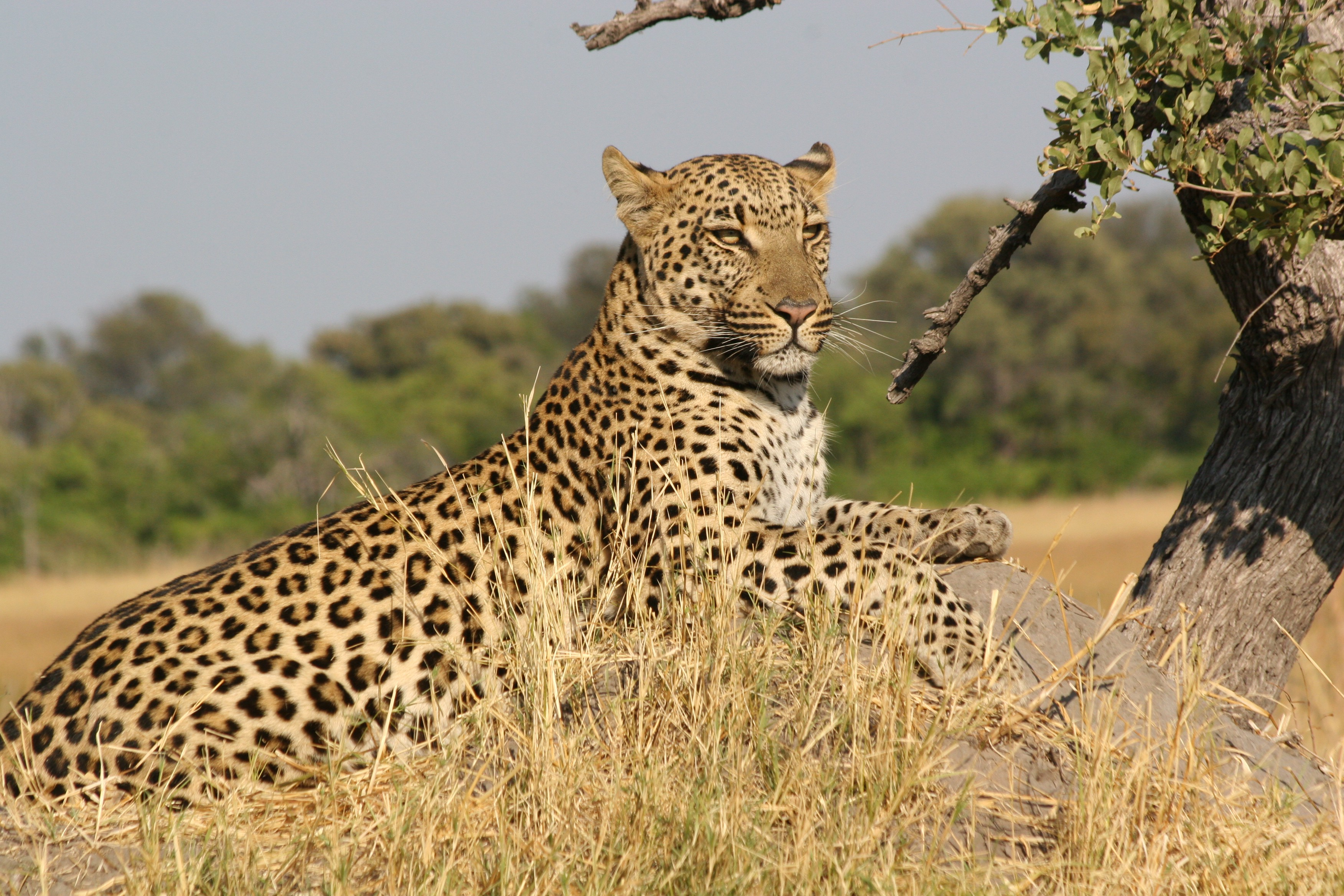
African leopard

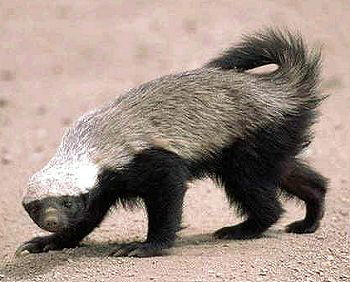
Honey badger

There are over 260 species of carnivorans, the majority of which feed primarily on meat. They have a characteristic skull shape and dentition.

- Suborder: Feliformia
  - Family: Felidae (cats)
    - Subfamily: Felinae
      - Genus: Caracal
        - Caracal, C. caracal LC
      - Genus: Leptailurus
        - Serval, Leptailurus serval LC
    - Subfamily: Pantherinae
      - Genus: Panthera
        - Lion, Panthera leo VU
        - Leopard, Panthera pardus VU
  - Family: Viverridae
    - Subfamily: Viverrinae
      - Genus: Civettictis
        - African civet, C. civetta LC
      - Genus: Genetta
        - Angolan genet, Genetta angolensis LC
        - Rusty-spotted genet, Genetta maculata LC
  - Family: Nandiniidae
    - Genus: Nandinia
      - African palm civet, Nandinia binotata LC
  - Family: Herpestidae (mongooses)
    - Genus: Atilax
      - Marsh mongoose, Atilax paludinosus LC
    - Genus: Bdeogale
      - Bushy-tailed mongoose, B. crassicauda LC
    - Genus: Helogale
      - Common dwarf mongoose, Helogale parvula LC
    - Genus: Herpestes
      - Egyptian mongoose, Herpestes ichneumon LC
      - Common slender mongoose, Herpestes sanguineus LC
    - Genus: Mungos
      - Banded mongoose, Mungos mungo LC
    - Genus: Paracynictis
      - Selous' mongoose, Paracynictis selousi LC
    - Genus: Rhynchogale
      - Meller's mongoose, Rhynchogale melleri LC
  - Family: Hyaenidae (hyaenas)
    - Genus: Crocuta
      - Spotted hyena, Crocuta crocuta LC
    - Genus: Parahyaena
      - Brown hyena, Parahyaena brunnea LC
- Suborder: Caniformia
  - Family: Canidae (dogs, foxes)
    - Genus: Lupulella
      - Side-striped jackal, L. adusta LC
    - Genus: Lycaon
      - African wild dog, Lycaon pictus EN
  - Family: Mustelidae (mustelids)
    - Genus: Ictonyx
      - Striped polecat, Ictonyx striatus LC
    - Genus: Poecilogale
      - African striped weasel, Poecilogale albinucha LC
    - Genus: Mellivora
      - Honey badger, M. capensis LC
    - Genus: Hydrictis
      - Spotted-necked otter, Hydrictis maculicollis LC
    - Genus: Aonyx
      - African clawless otter, Aonyx capensis LC

== Order: Perissodactyla (odd-toed ungulates) ==
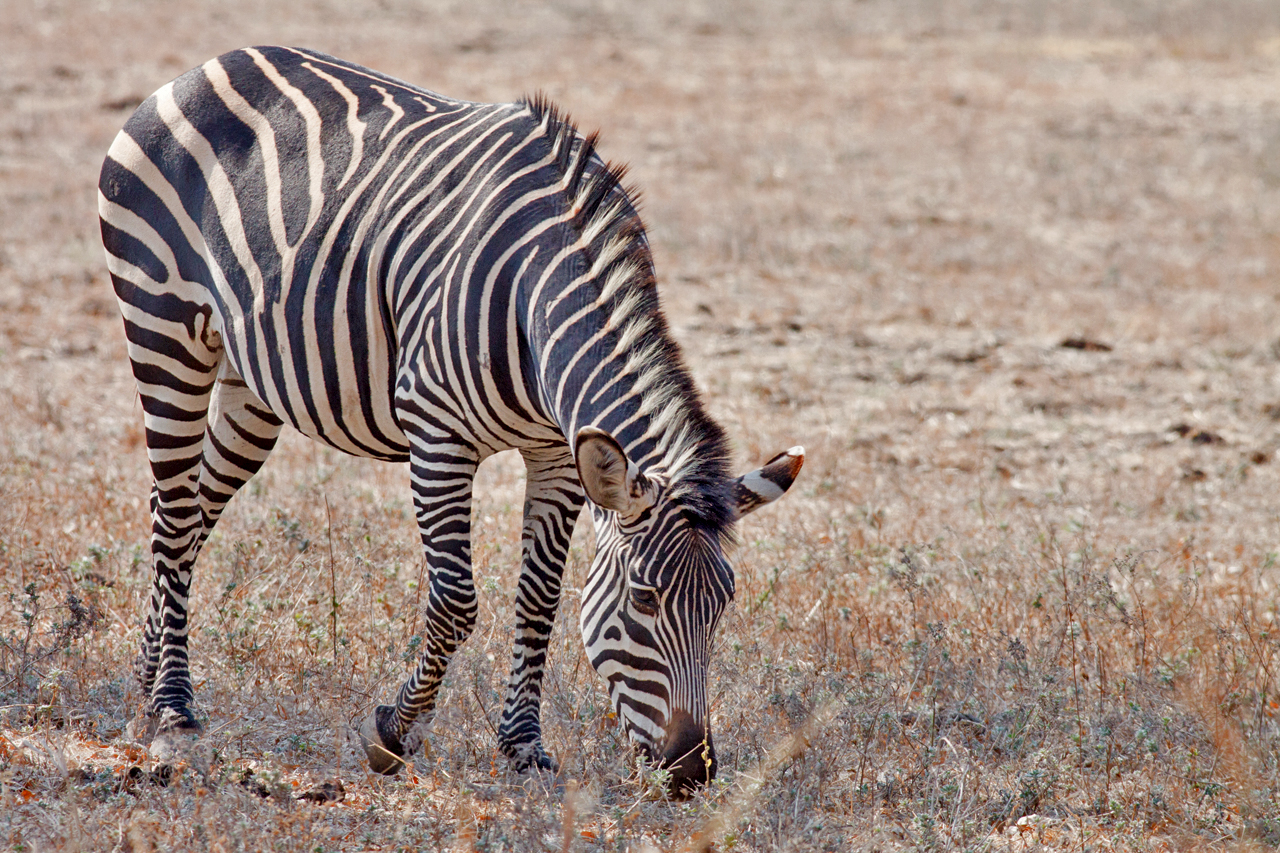
Crawshay's zebra

The odd-toed ungulates are browsing and grazing mammals. They are usually large to very large, and have relatively simple stomachs and a large middle toe.

- Family: Equidae (horses etc.)
  - Genus: Equus
    - Plains zebra, E. quagga NT
      - Crawshay's zebra, E. q. crawshayi
- Family: Rhinocerotidae
  - Genus: Diceros
    - Black rhinoceros, D. bicornis
      - South-central black rhinoceros, D. b. minor CR reintroduced

== Order: Artiodactyla (even-toed ungulates) ==
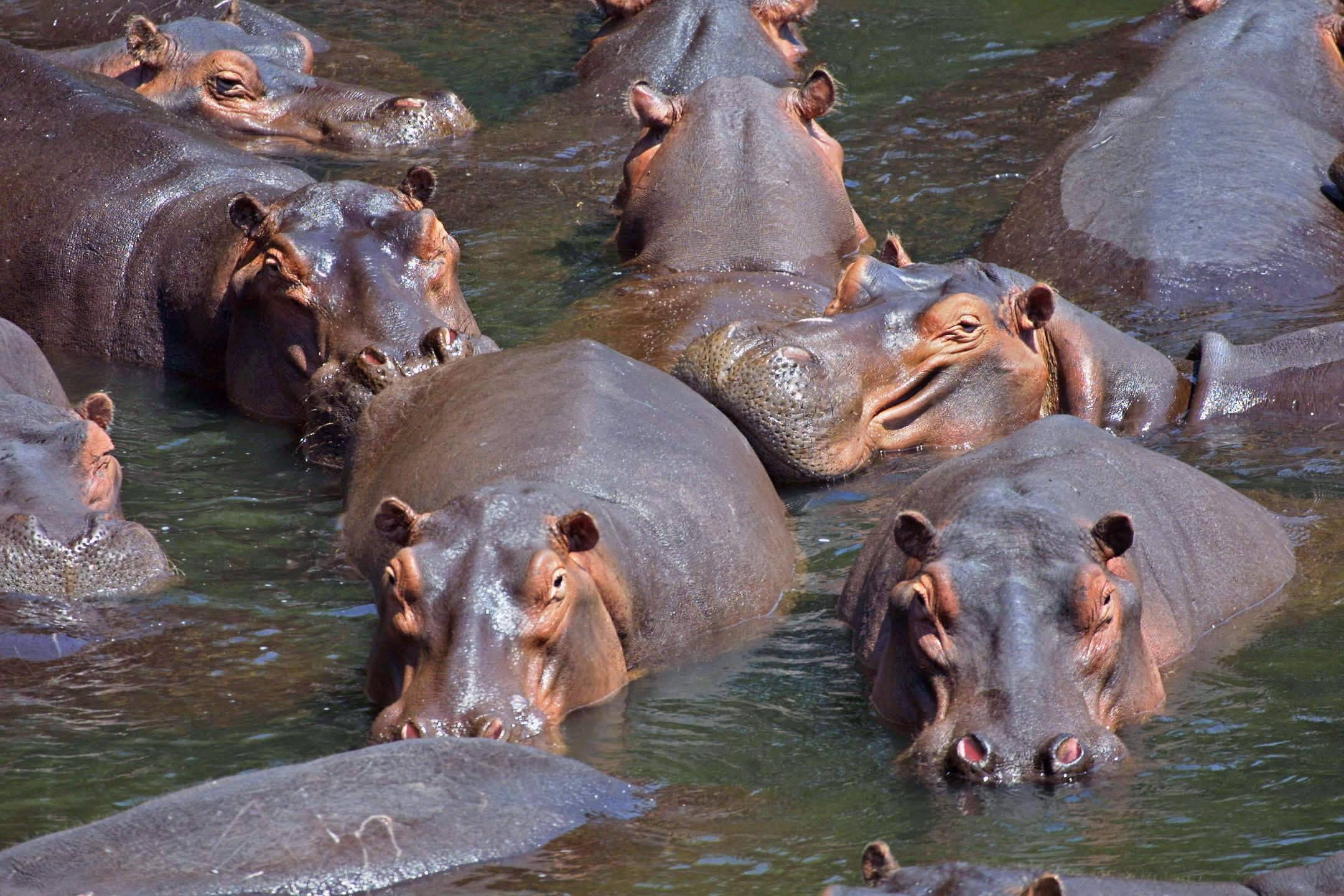
Hippopotamus

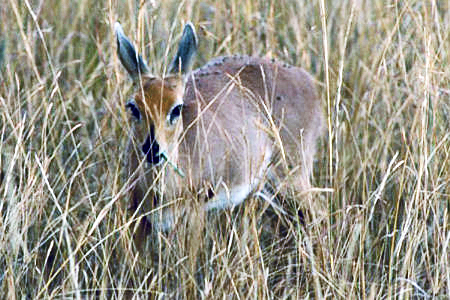
Oribi

]

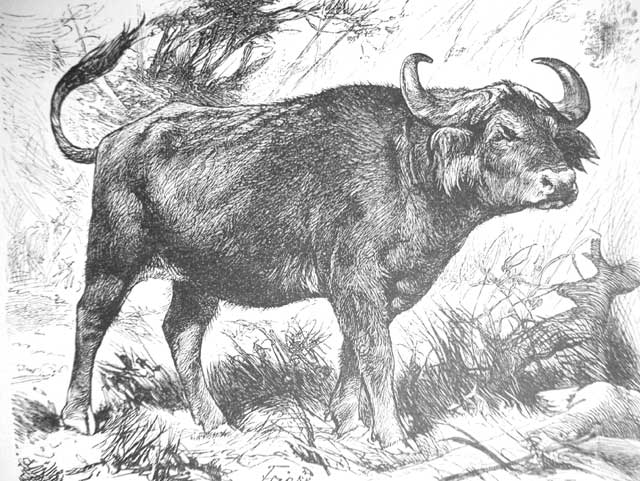
African buffalo

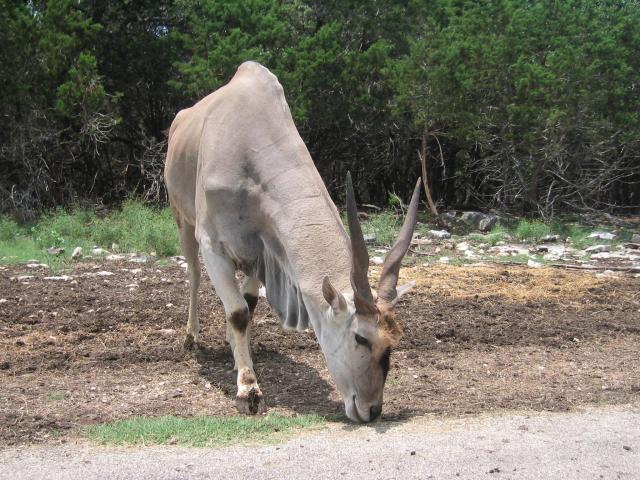
Common eland

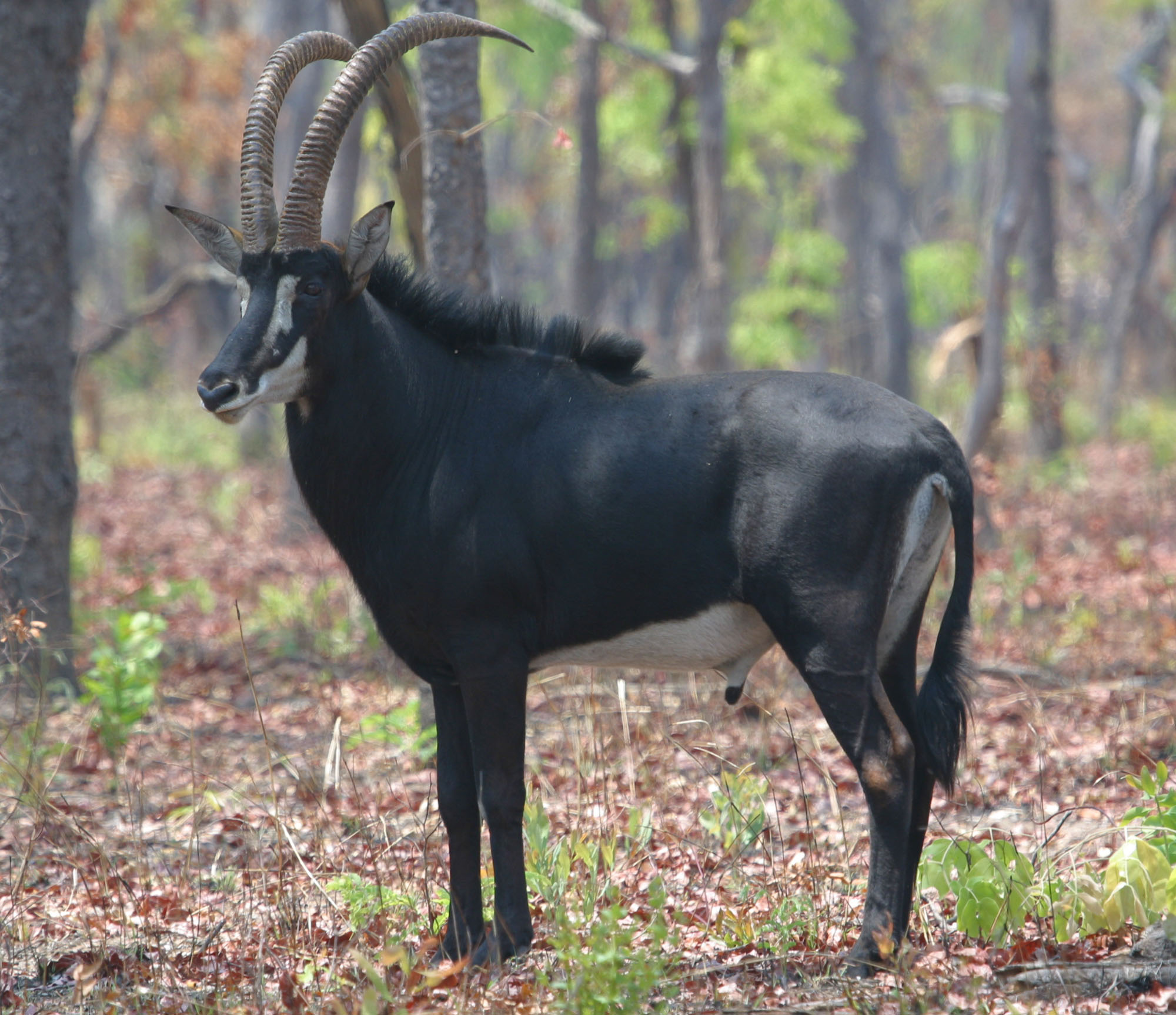
Sable antelope

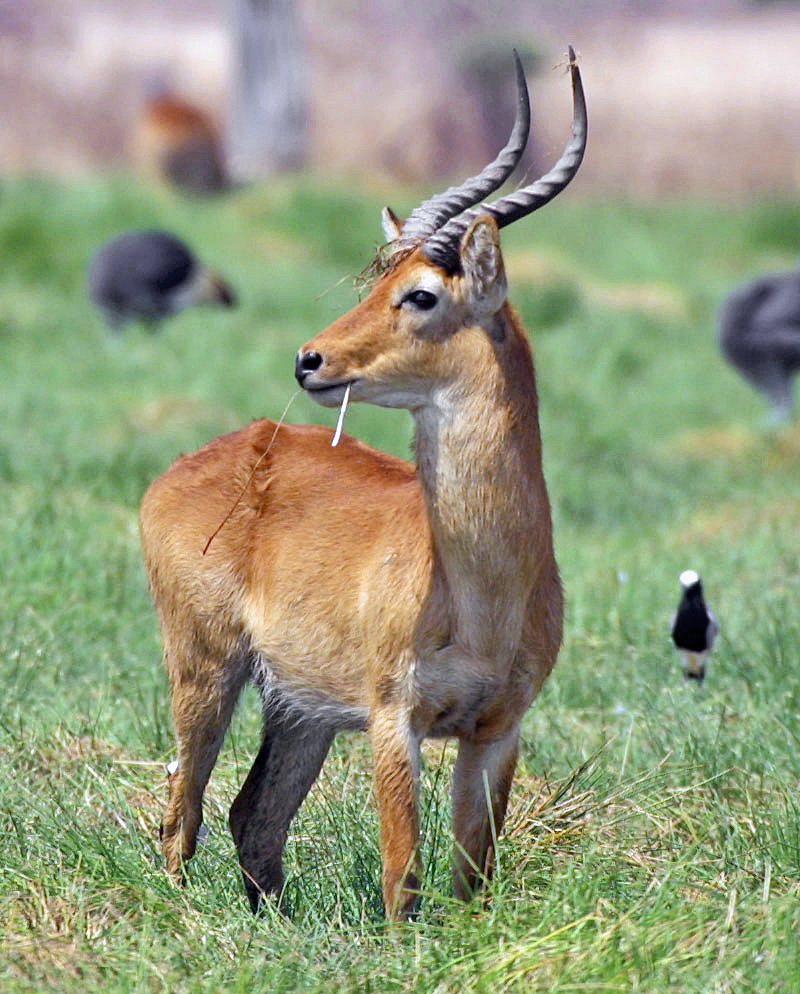
Puku

The even-toed ungulates are ungulates whose weight is borne about equally by the third and fourth toes, rather than mostly or entirely by the third as in perissodactyls. There are about 220 artiodactyl species, including many that are of great economic importance to humans.

- Family: Suidae (pigs)
  - Subfamily: Phacochoerinae
    - Genus: Phacochoerus
      - Common warthog, Phacochoerus africanus
  - Subfamily: Suinae
    - Genus: Potamochoerus
      - Bushpig, Potamochoerus larvatus
- Family: Hippopotamidae (hippopotamuses)
  - Genus: Hippopotamus
    - Hippopotamus, H. amphibius VU
- Family: Giraffidae (giraffe, okapi)
  - Genus: Giraffa
    - Giraffe, Giraffa camelopardalis VU extirpated, vagrant
- Family: Bovidae (cattle, antelope, sheep, goats)
  - Subfamily: Alcelaphinae
    - Genus: Alcelaphus
      - Lichtenstein's hartebeest, Alcelaphus lichtensteinii
    - Genus: Connochaetes
      - Blue wildebeest, Connochaetes taurinus
  - Subfamily: Antilopinae
    - Genus: Neotragus
      - Suni, Neotragus moschatus
    - Genus: Oreotragus
      - Klipspringer, Oreotragus oreotragus
    - Genus: Ourebia
      - Oribi, Ourebia ourebi
    - Genus: Raphicerus
      - Sharpe's grysbok, Raphicerus sharpei
      - Steenbok, Raphicerus campestris
  - Subfamily: Bovinae
    - Genus: Syncerus
      - African buffalo, S. caffer NT
    - Genus: Tragelaphus
      - Nyala, Tragelaphus angasii
      - Common eland, Tragelaphus oryx
      - Cape bushbuck, Tragelaphus scriptus
      - Greater kudu, Tragelaphus strepsiceros
  - Subfamily: Cephalophinae
    - Genus: Cephalophus
      - Blue duiker, Cephalophus monticola
      - Red forest duiker, Cephalophus natalensis
    - Genus: Sylvicapra
      - Common duiker, Sylvicapra grimmia
  - Subfamily: Hippotraginae
    - Genus: Hippotragus
      - Roan antelope, Hippotragus equinus
      - Sable antelope, Hippotragus niger
  - Subfamily: Aepycerotinae
    - Genus: Aepyceros
      - Impala, Aepyceros melampus
  - Subfamily: Reduncinae
    - Genus: Kobus
      - Waterbuck, Kobus ellipsiprymnus
      - Puku, Kobus vardonii
    - Genus: Redunca
      - Southern reedbuck, Redunca arundinum

== See also ==
- List of chordate orders
- Lists of mammals by region
- Mammal classification
- List of mammals described in the 2000s
