= Ethiopian vlei rat =

Typical vlei rat

Conservation status
- Least Concern (IUCN 3.1)

Scientific classification
- Kingdom: Animalia
- Phylum: Chordata
- Class: Mammalia
- Infraclass: Placentalia
- Order: Rodentia
- Family: Muridae
- Genus: Otomys
- Species: O. typus

Binomial name
- Otomys typus (Heuglin, 1877)

Synonyms
- Oreomys typus Heuglin, 1877

Species of rodent

The Ethiopian vlei rat (Otomys typus) is a species of vlei rat in the rodent family Muridae. It is found only in Ethiopia and is considered endemic.

== Taxonomy ==
Heuglin (1877) initially described the species under the name Oreomys typus. This species classification and that of the genus Otomys varied extremely throughout the years. Taylor et al. (2011) revised the history of this species and part of the genus itself. Otomys typus previously contained, as subspecies or synonyms, numerous current-day species, such as:

- Otomys fortior - Charada vlei rat (as a subspecies and later as a synonym)
- Otomys darmouthi - Ruwenzori vlei rat (as a subspecies)
- Otomys helleri - Heller's vlei rat (as a subspecies and later as a synonym)
- Otomys jacksoni - Mount Elgon vlei rat (as a subspecies)
- Otomys orestes - Afroalpine vlei rat (as a subspecies)
- Otomys thomasi - Thomas's vlei rat (as a subspecies and later as a synonym of O. orestes)
- Otomys uzungwensis - Uzungwe vlei rat (as a subspecies)
- Otomys zinki - Mount Kilimanjaro vlei rat (as a subspecies and later as a synonym of O. orestes).

Furthermore, the 2011 revision of this species-group distinguished four species inside O. typus and in Ethiopia:

- Otomys typus
- Otomys cheesmani sp. nov - Cheesman's vlei rat (Taylor, Lavrenchenko, Carleton, Verheyen, Bennett, Oosthuizen & Maree, 2011)
- Otomys simiensis sp. nov - Simien vlei rat (Taylor, Lavrenchenko, Carleton, Verheyen, Bennett, Oosthuizen & Maree, 2011)
- Otomys yaldeni sp. nov - Yalden's vlei rat (Taylor, Lavrenchenko, Carleton, Verheyen, Bennett, Oosthuizen & Maree, 2011).

== Habitat ==
Its natural habitats are subtropical or tropical moist montane forests, subtropical or tropical high-altitude shrubland, and subtropical or tropical high-altitude grassland.

== Conservation ==
It is said to be common.
