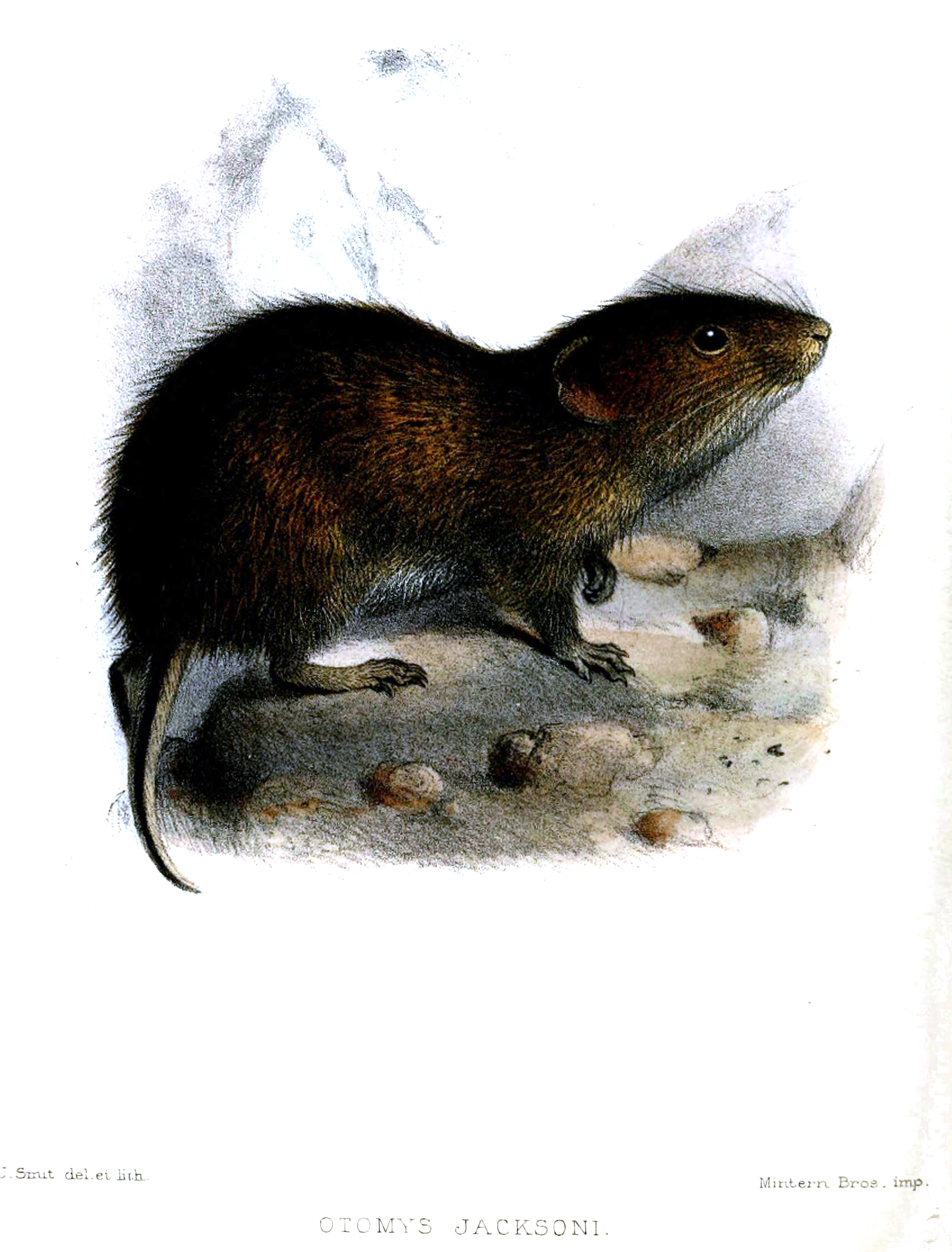
- O. jacksoni illustrated by Joseph Smit

Conservation status
- Near Threatened (IUCN 3.1)

Scientific classification
- Kingdom: Animalia
- Phylum: Chordata
- Class: Mammalia
- Order: Rodentia
- Family: Muridae
- Genus: Otomys
- Species: O. jacksoni

Binomial name
- Otomys jacksoni Thomas, 1891

Synonyms
- Otomys jacksoni jacksoni Allen, 1939; Otomys typus jacksoni Bohmann, 1952; Otomys typus [jacksoni] Misonne, 1974; Otomys irroratus [jacksoni] Delany, 1975

= Mount Elgon vlei rat =

Species of rodent

The Mount Elgon vlei rat (Otomys jacksoni) is a species of rodent in the family Muridae. It is endemic to Mount Elgon, an extinct volcano on the border between west-central Kenya and south-eastern Uganda. As of 2021, it is considered near threatened by the International Union for the Conservation of Nature and is under threat from fires and unsustainable resource extraction by humans.

== Description ==
Otomys jacksoni is medium to large in size and robust, resembling a vole, with a large rounded head, short tail, and shaggy brownish-black fur. The tail is dark on top but greyish white underneath. The lower incisors each have a pair of deep grooves.

== Distribution and habitat ==
Otomys jacksoni is found only on Mount Elgon, where it inhabits alpine meadows at altitudes of 3,300–4,200 m (10,800–13,800 ft) above sea level. The entire range of this species is located within Mount Elgon National Park.

== Taxonomy and history ==
OOtomys jacksoni was first described by British zoologist Oldfield Thomas based on three specimens collected from Mount Elgon in 1890 by Frederick John Jackson, from whose name the specific epithet jacksoni is derived. Thomas noted the similarity between these specimens and the existing species Otomys irroratus, but considered O. jacksoni to be a novel species due to the distinctive pair of grooves on the lower incisors. A 1952 paper proposed that O. jacksoni was actually a subspecies of O. typus, however, this was disputed by subsequent authors, and O. jacksoni was reinstated as a valid species in 2005.

Heller's vlei rat (Otomys helleri) was originally described as a subspecies of O. jacksoni, O. jacksoni helleri, but was elevated to species rank in 2011.
