= Dollman's vlei rat =

Scientific classification
- Kingdom: Animalia
- Phylum: Chordata
- Class: Mammalia
- Order: Rodentia
- Family: Muridae
- Genus: Otomys
- Species: O. dollmani

Binomial name
- Otomys dollmani Heller, 1912

Species of rodent

Dollman's vlei rat (Otomys dollmani) is a species of rodent in the family Muridae. It is found only in Kenya. Its natural habitats are subtropical or tropical high-altitude grassland and swamps. It is threatened by habitat loss. Some authorities, including the IUCN, regard it as a synonym of Otomys tropicalis.
