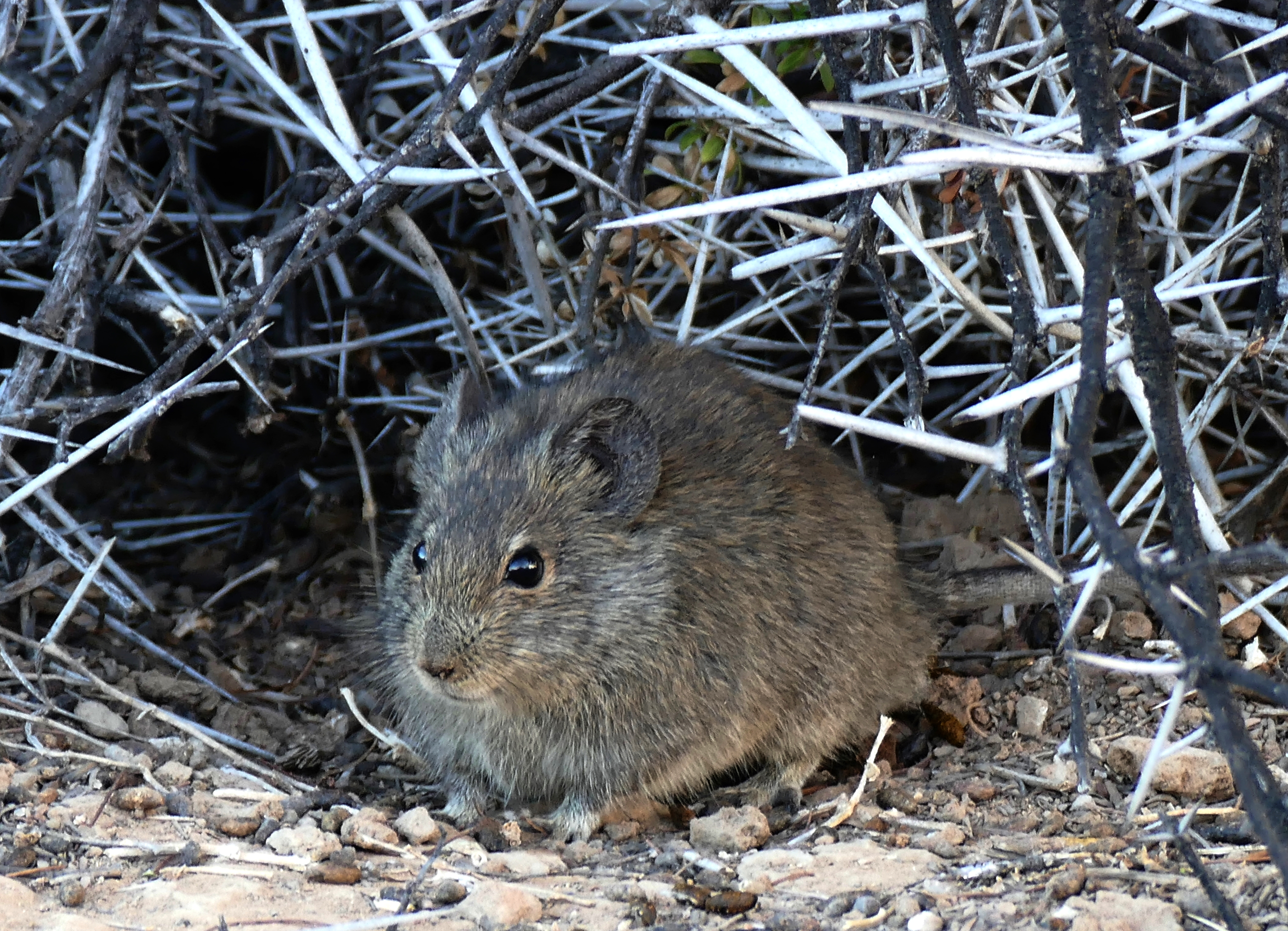

Conservation status
- Least Concern (IUCN 3.1)

Scientific classification
- Domain: Eukaryota
- Kingdom: Animalia
- Phylum: Chordata
- Class: Mammalia
- Order: Rodentia
- Family: Muridae
- Genus: Myotomys
- Species: M. unisulcatus

Binomial name
- Myotomys unisulcatus (F. Cuvier, 1829)

Synonyms
- Otomys unisulcatus

= Bush vlei rat =

Species of rodent

The bush vlei rat or Karoo bush rat (Myotomys unisulcatus, formerly Otomys unisulcatus) is a species of rodent in the family Muridae. It is found in Namibia and South Africa. Its natural habitat is temperate shrubland. The Karoo rat uses behavioral adaptations to cope with the dry arid climate. It is a medium-sized rodent with a dark pelage on top and lighter underneath. It has light colored feet and a dark tail. The rat may have light colored fur around its eyes and the back of its ears.

== Environment ==
The Karoo bush rat can be found in the semi-deserts of South Africa. These deserts have extreme temperature fluctuations ranging from below 0 °C (32 °F) in the winter to over 40 °C (104 °F) in the summer. The Karoo bush rat unlike most rodents creates a refuge made of interwoven sticks and is sited on the surface. These stick lodges are found in the shrubs of the desert. They can be over 1 m (3.3 ft) tall and there is only one lodge per bush/shrub. These stick lodges offer protection against the extreme climates, predators, and also a physiological refuge. The temperature variation in the nests are significantly less than the surrounding ambient temperatures with the temperature in the winter being about 4 °C (39 °F) higher inside the nest than outside and 14 °C (57 °F) lower during the summer than the outside temperatures.

In the Postberg Nature Reserve in coastal Western Cape Province, the rat uses the plant stems of the native bush shrub Exomis to make its lodges.

== Reproduction ==
In the family Muridae the Karoo bush rat has a strong correlation between reproduction, the abundant resources, and the occupation of the stick lodges. Myotomys unisulcatus has very rapid postnatal development and small litters of semi-precocial young. The average litter size is two to three. Weaning begins at eight days of age and reproduction can begin at six weeks for males and five weeks of age for females.

== Diet ==
The Karoo bush rat is limited in diet due to its dry and arid climate. They are considered herbivores, eating foliage and succulent stems from 60 different plant species. In the winter they consume mostly succulents, in the spring they consume an even mix of succulents, non-succulents, and annual vegetation. In the summer and fall months they consume succulent and annual plants evenly. To gather food they bite off lengths of vegetation and drag them to the entrances of their stick refuges where they will consume the resources gathered.
