= O. maximus =

O. maximus may refer to:

- Ornithorhynchus maximus, a supposed extinct platypus species, now known to be based on an echidna
- Otomys maximus, the large Vlei rat, a rodent species found in Angola, Botswana, Democratic Republic of the Congo, Namibia and Zambia

== See also ==
- Maximus (disambiguation)
