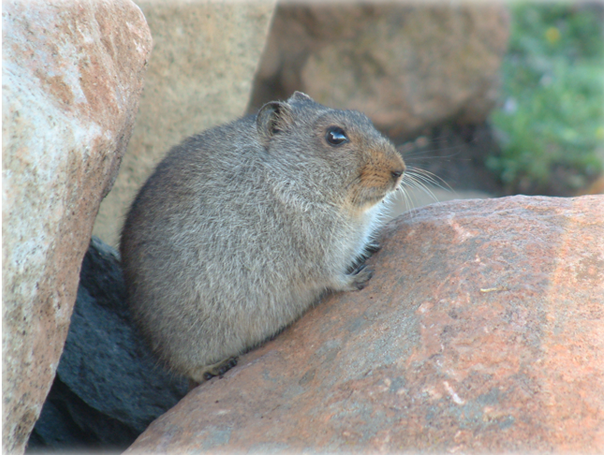

Conservation status
- Least Concern (IUCN 3.1)

Scientific classification
- Kingdom: Animalia
- Phylum: Chordata
- Class: Mammalia
- Order: Rodentia
- Family: Muridae
- Genus: Myotomys
- Species: M. sloggetti

Binomial name
- Myotomys sloggetti (Thomas, 1902)

Synonyms
- Otomys sloggetti

= Sloggett's vlei rat =

Species of rodent

Sloggett's vlei rat or ice rat (Myotomys sloggetti) is a species of rodent in the family Muridae. It is found in southern Lesotho and South Africa where its natural habitats are subtropical or tropical high-altitude grassland, swamps, and rocky areas. Its name commemorates Col. Arthur Sloggett who served in South Africa and collected at Deelfontein in 1902. This is a common species and the International Union for Conservation of Nature has rated it as being of "least concern".

== Description ==
This is a medium-sized rat with thick, soft, fine fur. The head is large and the snout blunt. The area of skin surrounding the whiskers is reddish brown, a characteristic that distinguishes this species from other members of the genus Otomys. The ears are small with dark edges. The upper parts are greyish buff and the flanks greyish brown. The underparts are buffy white. The tail is short, being about half the length of the head and body. It is bicoloured, being black above and buff below.

== Distribution and habitat ==
Sloggett's vlei rat is endemic to southern Africa where it occurs in southern Lesotho, the Eastern Cape as well as the western parts of KwaZulu-Natal in South Africa. It inhabits rocky habitats and alpine grassland, both wet and dry, at altitudes of more than 2,000 m (6,600 ft), and usually above 2,600 m (8,500 ft).

== Ecology ==
In suitable habitats this rodent is common; densities of over 100 animals per hectare have been observed. They live in burrows, emerging during the day to forage and sun themselves on the rocks. The diet consists of the leaves, flowers and stems of green plants. In summer, the food is eaten where it is found but in winter it is mostly taken back to the burrow for consumption. Some food is also stored in the burrow, which has a complex system of tunnels and chambers and is usually occupied by a pair or a family group, of which only one female will breed. Although territorial outside the burrow, the animals will huddle together inside for warmth. They are active throughout the year but spend more time underground in winter.

There may be up to a dozen entrances to the burrow, and faeces are deposited beside these. Breeding takes place in late summer, the litter size averaging 2.5 young and the gestation period being about 38 days. The young have several adaptations to the extreme cold in winter: their body, ears, limbs and tail are short compared to those of the southern African vlei rat (Otomys irroratus), reducing their heat loss, and the lactation period is long so they can remain underground until they reach a greater age.
