= D'Anchieta's fruit bat =

Conservation status
- Least Concern (IUCN 3.1)

Scientific classification
- Kingdom: Animalia
- Phylum: Chordata
- Class: Mammalia
- Order: Chiroptera
- Family: Pteropodidae
- Genus: Plerotes; K. Andersen, 1910
- Species: P. anchietae

Binomial name
- Plerotes anchietae (de Seabra, 1900)
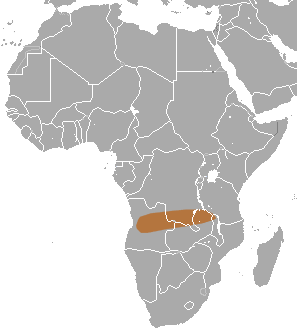
- D'Anchieta's Fruit Bat range

Synonyms
- Epomorphus anchietae Seabra, 1900

Species of bat

D'Anchieta's fruit bat or D'Anchieta's epauletted bat (Plerotes anchietae) is a species of megabat in the family Pteropodidae. It is the only species in the genus Plerotes. It is found in Angola, Democratic Republic of the Congo, Malawi, and Zambia, where it lives in subtropical or tropical dry forests, dry savanna, and moist savanna.

The scientific and common names for the species commemorate José Alberto de Oliveira Anchieta, who is also honoured in the names of Anchieta's pipistrelle (Hypsugo anchietae) and the Angolan vlei rat (Otomys anchietae). It was described in 1900 by Antero Frederico de Seabra, under the name Epomorphus anchietae.
