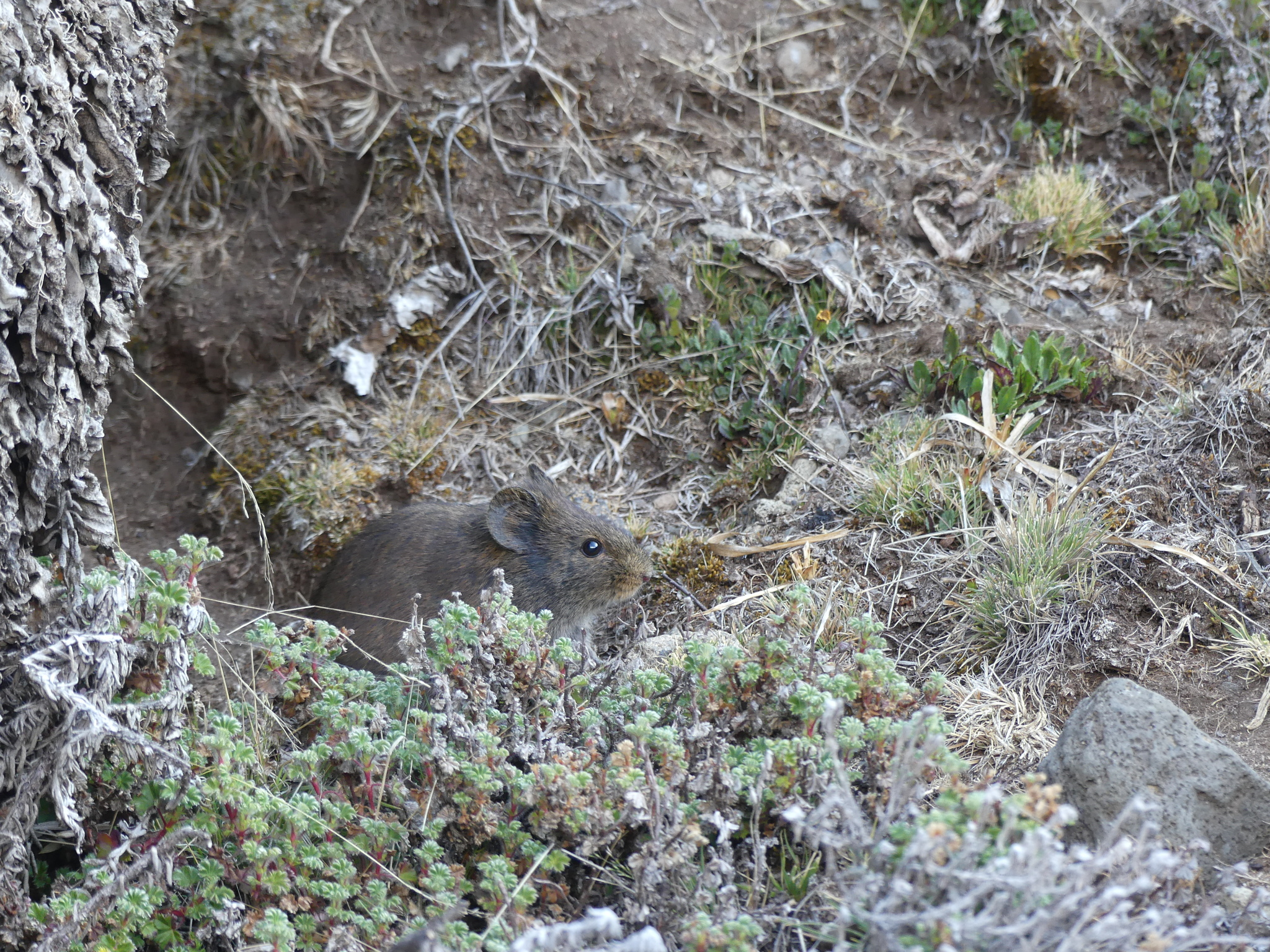

Conservation status
- Vulnerable (IUCN 3.1)

Scientific classification
- Kingdom: Animalia
- Phylum: Chordata
- Class: Mammalia
- Order: Rodentia
- Family: Muridae
- Genus: Otomys
- Species: O. zinki

Binomial name
- Otomys zinki Bohmann, 1943

= Mount Kilimanjaro vlei rat =

Species of rodent

Mount Kilimanjaro vlei rat (Otomys zinki) is a species of rodent in the family Muridae. It is found in north-eastern Tanzania, on Mount Kilimanjaro.

== Taxonomy ==
Bohmann (1943) initially described this species as Otomys typus zinki. It was kept under Otomys typus (Ethiopian vlei rat) by Bohmann in 1952 and moved under Otomys orestes (Afroalpine vlei rat) in the classification of Musser and Carleton (2005). However, this species was considered to be distinct by Taylor et al. (2011).

== Threats ==
It is known from only one location in Tanzania (Mt. Kilimanjaro). Although it occurs in a protected area, threats such as fires, climate change and habitat loss could lead the species to extinction in a short timespan.
