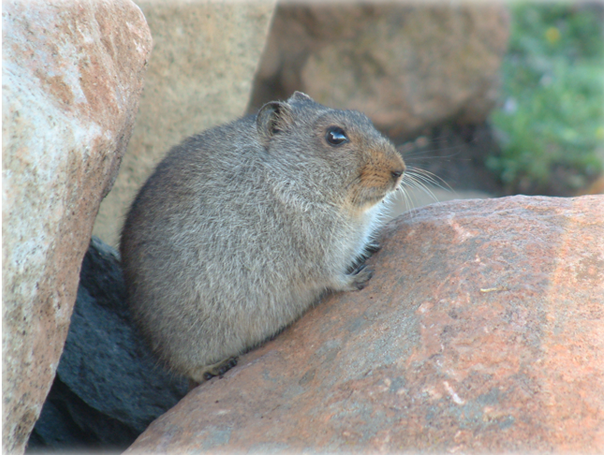
- Sloggett's vlei rat (Myotomys sloggetti)

Scientific classification
- Domain: Eukaryota
- Kingdom: Animalia
- Phylum: Chordata
- Class: Mammalia
- Order: Rodentia
- Family: Muridae
- Tribe: Otomyini
- Genus: Myotomys; Thomas, 1918

Type species
- Otomys unisulcatus

Species
- Myotomys sloggetti Myotomys unisulcatus

= Myotomys =

African karoo rats

Genus of rodents

Myotomys is a genus of African Karoo rats that inhabit the Karoo, a semi-desert region in the southern portion of the African continent. Previously placed in the genus Otomys, they are sometimes referred to as vlei rats.

== Species ==
Genus Myotomys

- Sloggett's vlei rat (rock Karoo rat, ice rat), Myotomys sloggetti
- Bush vlei rat, Myotomys unisulcatus
