= Laminate vlei rat =

Conservation status
- Near Threatened (IUCN 3.1)

Scientific classification
- Kingdom: Animalia
- Phylum: Chordata
- Class: Mammalia
- Order: Rodentia
- Family: Muridae
- Genus: Otomys
- Species: O. laminatus

Binomial name
- Otomys laminatus Thomas & Schwann, 1905

Species of rodent

The laminate vlei rat (Otomys laminatus) is a species of rodent in the family Muridae. It is found only in South Africa. Its natural habitats are subtropical or tropical high-altitude grassland and swamps.
