= Barbour's vlei rat =

Conservation status
- Endangered (IUCN 3.1)

Scientific classification
- Kingdom: Animalia
- Phylum: Chordata
- Class: Mammalia
- Order: Rodentia
- Family: Muridae
- Genus: Otomys
- Species: O. barbouri

Binomial name
- Otomys barbouri Lawrence & Loveridge, 1953

Species of rodent

Barbour's vlei rat (Otomys barbouri) is a species of rodent in the family Muridae. It is found in Kenya and Uganda. Its natural habitat is subtropical or tropical high-altitude shrubland. It is threatened by habitat loss.
