= Charada vlei rat =

Conservation status
- Vulnerable (IUCN 3.1)

Scientific classification
- Kingdom: Animalia
- Phylum: Chordata
- Class: Mammalia
- Infraclass: Placentalia
- Order: Rodentia
- Family: Muridae
- Genus: Otomys
- Species: O. fortior

Binomial name
- Otomys fortior Thomas, 1906

Species of rodent

Charada vlei rat (Otomys fortior) is a species of rodent in the family of Muridae. It is endemic to southwestern Ethiopia.

== Taxonomy ==
Thomas (1906) initially described this species under the name Otomys typus fortior. It was then elevated to species status by Dollmann (1915). It was again re-included under O. typus (Ethiopian vlei rat) in the classification by Allen in 1939. Taylor et al. (2011) moved Otomys fortior back to species status, arguing that the biogeographical and ecological separation of the species from the other members of the genus in the region was sufficient.

== Conservation ==
It is known from less than 10 locations in Ethiopia and its population is suggested to be declining as well as its habitat, hence the assessment of the species as "Vulnerable" by the IUCN.
