= Antero Frederico de Seabra =

- Born: Antero Frederico Ferreira de Seabra; 20 August 1874; Lisbon, Portugal
- Died: 15 November 1952 (aged 78); Lisbon, Portugal
- Scientific career
- Fields: Zoology
- Institutions: Museu Zoológico de Lisboa; Vasco da Gama Aquarium; University of Lisbon

Antero Frederico de Seabra (sometimes Anthero; 20 August 1874 – 15 November 1952) was a Portuguese naturalist. He was founder and president of the Society of Biological Sciences. He particularly specialized in entomology, publishing a series of foundational papers on the family Aradidae.

== Taxa named by him and in his honor ==
Species named in Seabra's honor include:

- Angolan hairy bat (Cistugo seabrae)
- Geocharis antheroi

Taxa described by Seabra:

- Anchieta's pipistrelle (Pipistrellus anchietae)
- D'Anchieta's fruit bat (Plerotes anchietae)
- Yellow serotine (Neoromicia flavescens)
- Hemiberlesia camarana
