= Saunder's vlei rat =

Conservation status
- Least Concern (IUCN 3.1)

Scientific classification
- Kingdom: Animalia
- Phylum: Chordata
- Class: Mammalia
- Order: Rodentia
- Family: Muridae
- Genus: Otomys
- Species: O. saundersiae

Binomial name
- Otomys saundersiae Roberts, 1929

Species of rodent

Saunder's vlei rat (Otomys saundersiae) is a species of rodent in the family Muridae. It is found only in South Africa. Its natural habitats are subtropical or tropical dry shrubland, Mediterranean-type shrubby vegetation, and subtropical or tropical high-altitude grassland.

== Taxonomy ==
Saunder's vlei rat was described by Austin Roberts, a South African zoologist. Roberts originally described this taxon as a subspecies of tugelensis (Otomys angoniensis) in his 1929 description, but in 1951 he raised it to full species status. The species was named after Enid Saunders.

The form karoensis, found in Western Cape Province, has been treated by some authors as a distinct species (G. M. Allen, 1939; Bohmann, 1952; Roberts, 1931; Taylor et al., 1993), while others have considered it a distinctive subspecies of Otomys saundersiae.
