= Burton's vlei rat =

Conservation status
- Endangered (IUCN 3.1)

Scientific classification
- Kingdom: Animalia
- Phylum: Chordata
- Class: Mammalia
- Order: Rodentia
- Family: Muridae
- Genus: Otomys
- Species: O. burtoni

Binomial name
- Otomys burtoni Thomas, 1918

Species of rodent

Burton's vlei rat (Otomys burtoni) is a species of rodent in the family Muridae. It is found only in Cameroon. Its natural habitats are subtropical or tropical high-altitude shrubland, subtropical or tropical high-altitude grassland, and swamps. It is threatened by habitat loss.
