= Cuanza vlei rat =

Conservation status
- Least Concern (IUCN 3.1)

Scientific classification
- Kingdom: Animalia
- Phylum: Chordata
- Class: Mammalia
- Order: Rodentia
- Family: Muridae
- Genus: Otomys
- Species: O. cuanzensis

Binomial name
- Otomys cuanzensis Hill & Carter, 1937

Species of rodent

The Cuanza vlei rat (Otomys cuanzensis) is a species of rodent in the family Muridae. It is found only in Angola. Its natural habitats are subtropical or tropical high-altitude grassland and swampland.
