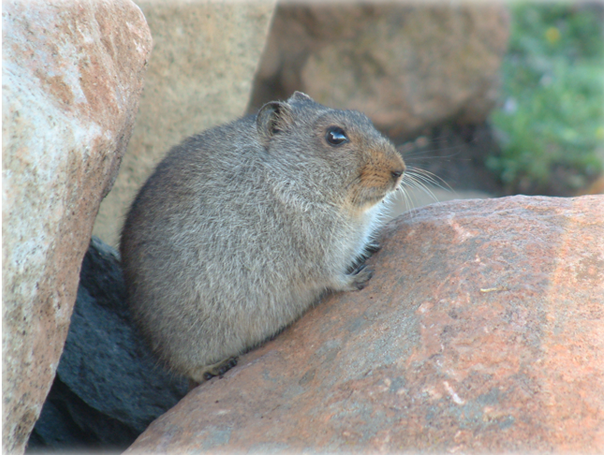
- Myotomys sloggetti

Scientific classification
- Kingdom: Animalia
- Phylum: Chordata
- Class: Mammalia
- Order: Rodentia
- Family: Muridae
- Subfamily: Murinae
- Tribe: Otomyini; Thomas, 1897

Genera
- Myotomys; Otomys; Parotomys

= Otomyini =

Tribe of rodents

Otomyini is an Old World tribe of muroid rodents in the subfamily Murinae. Musser and Carleton (2005) granted it subfamily status (Otomyinae), but molecular studies consistently show that the otomyines evolved from within the Murinae, leading these researchers to subsume it in this subfamily, sometimes with tribal status (Jansa and Weksler, 2004; Michaux et al., 2001; Steppan et al., 2004). It includes 3 genera.
