= Heller's vlei rat =

Conservation status
- Least Concern (IUCN 3.1)

Scientific classification
- Kingdom: Animalia
- Phylum: Chordata
- Class: Mammalia
- Infraclass: Placentalia
- Order: Rodentia
- Family: Muridae
- Genus: Otomys
- Species: O. helleri

Binomial name
- Otomys helleri Frick, 1914

Synonyms
- Otomys jacksoni ssp. helleri Frick, 1914; Otomys typus ssp. helleri Frick, 1914; Otomys jacksoni ssp. malkensis; Otomys typus ssp. malkensis

Species of rodent

Heller's vlei rat (Otomys helleri) is a species of rodent in the family of Muridae. It is endemic to Ethiopia and is found on the Arussi Plateau and the Bale Mountains.

== Taxonomy ==
Childs Frick (1914) initially described this species under the name Otomys jacksoni helleri. It was then included under O. typus (Ethiopian vlei rat) as a subspecies, and later as a synonym until Taylor et al. (2011) elevated the taxa to species status.

== Conservation ==
It is listed as "Least Concern" by the IUCN, due to a vast area of occurrence.
