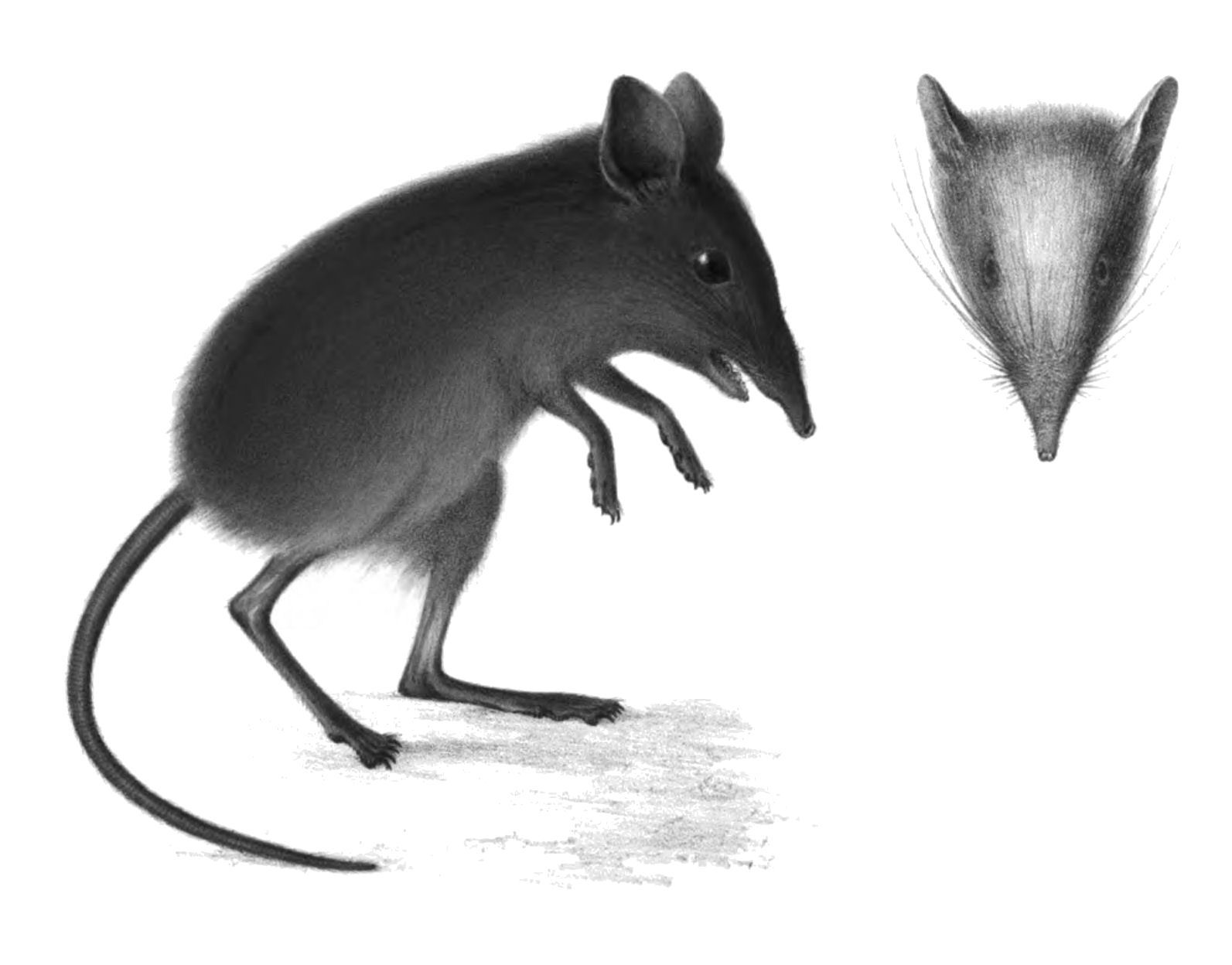

Conservation status
- Data Deficient (IUCN 3.1)

Scientific classification
- Kingdom: Animalia
- Phylum: Chordata
- Class: Mammalia
- Infraclass: Placentalia
- Order: Macroscelidea
- Family: Macroscelididae
- Genus: Elephantulus
- Species: E. fuscus

Binomial name
- Elephantulus fuscus (Peters, 1852)
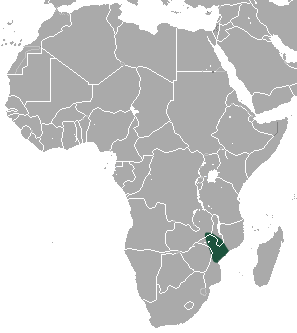
- Dusky sengi range

= Dusky sengi =

Species of mammal

The dusky sengi or dusky elephant shrew (Elephantulus fuscus) is a species of sengi in the family Macroscelididae. It is found in Malawi, Mozambique, and Zambia. Its natural habitat is dry savanna.
