= Ruwenzori vlei rat =

Conservation status
- Data Deficient (IUCN 3.1)

Scientific classification
- Kingdom: Animalia
- Phylum: Chordata
- Class: Mammalia
- Order: Rodentia
- Family: Muridae
- Genus: Otomys
- Species: O. dartmouthi

Binomial name
- Otomys dartmouthi Thomas, 1906

Species of rodent

The Ruwenzori vlei rat (Otomys dartmouthi) is a species of rodent in the family Muridae. It is found only in Uganda. Its natural habitat is subtropical or tropical high-altitude grassland.
