= Large vlei rat =

Conservation status
- Least Concern (IUCN 3.1)

Scientific classification
- Kingdom: Animalia
- Phylum: Chordata
- Class: Mammalia
- Order: Rodentia
- Family: Muridae
- Genus: Otomys
- Species: O. maximus

Binomial name
- Otomys maximus Roberts, 1924

Species of rodent

The large vlei rat (Otomys maximus) is a species of rodent in the family Muridae. It is found in Angola, Botswana, Democratic Republic of the Congo, Namibia, and Zambia. Its natural habitats are moist savanna, subtropical or tropical seasonally wet or flooded lowland grassland, and swamps.
