= Angoni vlei rat =

Conservation status
- Least Concern (IUCN 3.1)

Scientific classification
- Kingdom: Animalia
- Phylum: Chordata
- Class: Mammalia
- Order: Rodentia
- Family: Muridae
- Genus: Otomys
- Species: O. angoniensis

Binomial name
- Otomys angoniensis Wroughton, 1906

Species of rodent

The Angoni vlei rat (Otomys angoniensis) is a species of rodent in the family Muridae. It is found in Botswana, Kenya, Malawi, Mozambique, South Africa, Eswatini, Tanzania, Zambia, and Zimbabwe.

Its natural habitats are moist savanna, temperate grassland, subtropical or tropical seasonally wet or flooded lowland grassland, swamps, and pastureland. It is not considered threatened by the IUCN.
