= Tropical vlei rat =

Conservation status
- Least Concern (IUCN 3.1)

Scientific classification
- Kingdom: Animalia
- Phylum: Chordata
- Class: Mammalia
- Order: Rodentia
- Family: Muridae
- Genus: Otomys
- Species: O. tropicalis

Binomial name
- Otomys tropicalis Thomas, 1902

Species of rodent

The tropical vlei rat (Otomys tropicalis) is a species of rodent in the family Muridae. It is found in Burundi, Democratic Republic of the Congo, Kenya, Rwanda, South Sudan, and Uganda. Its natural habitats are subtropical or tropical seasonally wet or flooded lowland grassland, subtropical or tropical high-altitude grassland, swamps, and plantations.
