= Thomas's vlei rat =

Conservation status
- Vulnerable (IUCN 3.1)

Scientific classification
- Kingdom: Animalia
- Phylum: Chordata
- Class: Mammalia
- Order: Rodentia
- Family: Muridae
- Genus: Otomys
- Species: O. thomasi

Binomial name
- Otomys thomasi Osgood, 1910

Synonyms
- Otomys typus ssp. thomasi Bohmann 1952

Species of rodent

Thomas's vlei rat (Otomys thomasi) is a species of rodent in the family Muridae. It is endemic to Kenya's high plateau mountains of the Rift Valley.

== Taxonomy ==
Osgood (1910) initially described this species as Otomys thomasi. In 2006, it would be included under Otomys orestes (afroalpine vlei rat) by Carleton & Byrne. Taylor et al. (2011) reviewed the genus Otomys and moved Otomys thomasi back to species status.

== Conservation ==
It is known from less than 10 locations in Kenya and isn't recorded in protected areas, hence the assessment of the species as "Vulnerable" by the IUCN.
