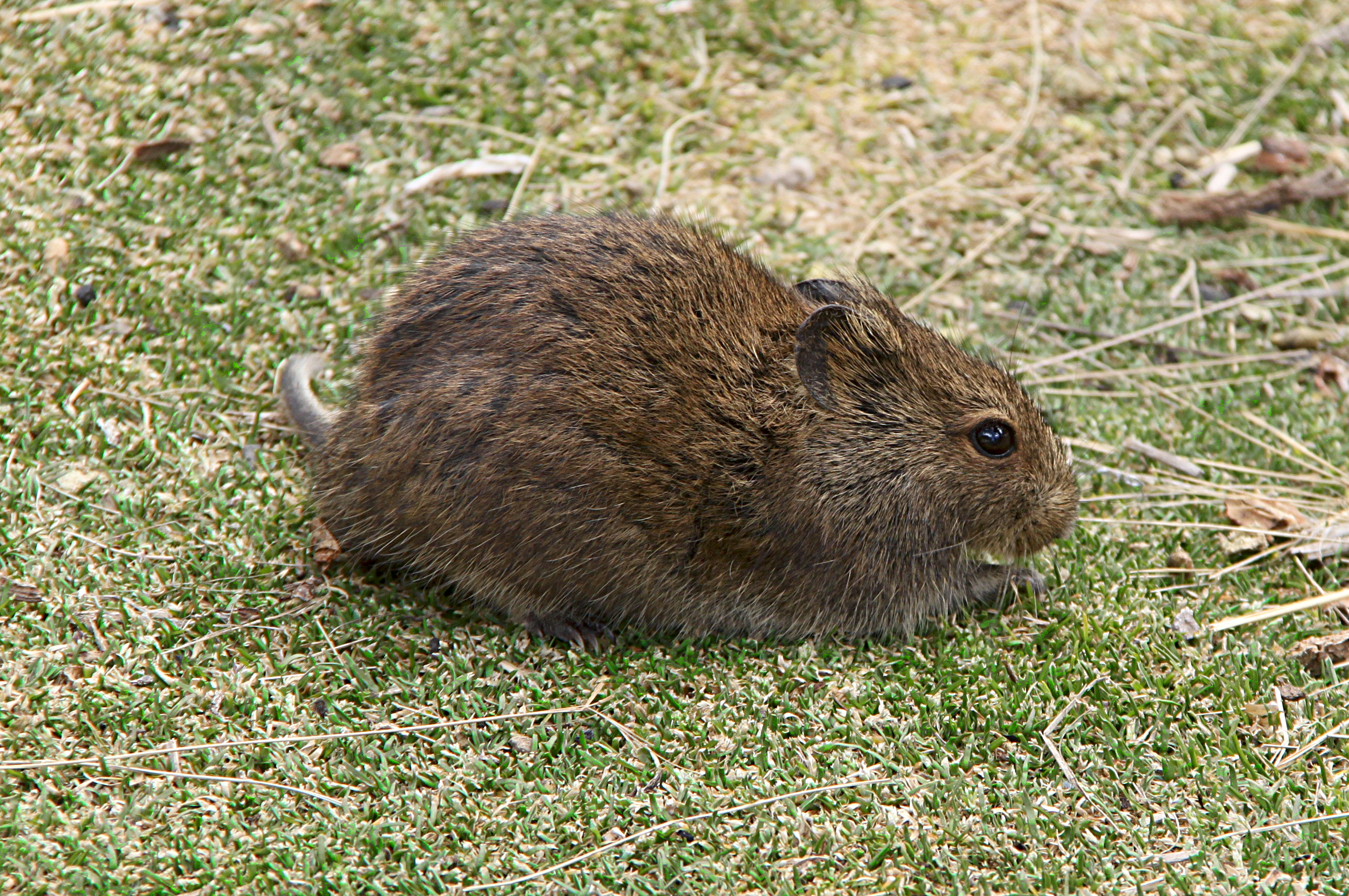

Conservation status
- Data Deficient (IUCN 3.1)

Scientific classification
- Kingdom: Animalia
- Phylum: Chordata
- Class: Mammalia
- Infraclass: Placentalia
- Order: Rodentia
- Family: Muridae
- Genus: Otomys
- Species: O. orestes

Binomial name
- Otomys orestes Thomas, 1900

= Afroalpine vlei rat =

Species of rodent

The afroalpine vlei rat (Otomys orestes) is a species of rodent in the family Muridae. It is found in the high moorlands of Kenya.

== Taxonomy ==
Musser and Carleton (2005) included a number of asynonyms. Among these was Otomys thomasi (Thomas's vlei rat), which was initially described as a species by Osgood in 1910. However, Taylor et al. (2011) found that O. thomasi, O. zinki (Mount Kilimanjaro vlei rat) and others are distinct from O. orestes.
