= Yellow serotine =

Conservation status
- Data Deficient (IUCN 3.1)

Scientific classification
- Kingdom: Animalia
- Phylum: Chordata
- Class: Mammalia
- Order: Chiroptera
- Family: Vespertilionidae
- Genus: Neoromicia
- Species: N. flavescens

Binomial name
- Neoromicia flavescens (Seabra, 1900)

Synonyms
- Eptesicus flavescens (Seabra, 1900)

Species of bat

The yellow serotine (Neoromicia flavescens) is a species of vesper bat. It is found in Angola, Burundi, Cameroon, Malawi, and Mozambique. Its natural habitats are subtropical or tropical forests and savanna.
