= Yalden's vlei rat =

Conservation status
- Vulnerable (IUCN 3.1)

Scientific classification
- Kingdom: Animalia
- Phylum: Chordata
- Class: Mammalia
- Order: Rodentia
- Family: Muridae
- Genus: Otomys
- Species: O. yaldeni

Binomial name
- Otomys yaldeni Taylor, Lavrenchenko, Carleton, Verheyen, Bennett, Oosthuizen & Maree, 2011

Species of rodent

The Yalden's vlei rat (Otomys yaldeni) is a species of rodent in the family Muridae. It is found in the Bale Mountains, in southwestern Ethiopia.

== Conservation ==
It is listed as "Vulnerable" by the IUCN due to being known from less than 10 locations and the reduction of the habitat of the species.
