= Angolan vlei rat =

Conservation status
- Least Concern (IUCN 3.1)

Scientific classification
- Kingdom: Animalia
- Phylum: Chordata
- Class: Mammalia
- Order: Rodentia
- Family: Muridae
- Genus: Otomys
- Species: O. anchietae

Binomial name
- Otomys anchietae Bocage, 1882

Species of rodent

The Angolan vlei rat (Otomys anchietae) is a species of rodent in the family Muridae. It is found only in Angola. Its natural habitats are dry savanna, moist savanna, and subtropical or tropical seasonally wet or flooded lowland grassland. It is threatened by habitat loss.
