= Simien vlei rat =

Conservation status
- Least Concern (IUCN 3.1)

Scientific classification
- Kingdom: Animalia
- Phylum: Chordata
- Class: Mammalia
- Order: Rodentia
- Family: Muridae
- Genus: Otomys
- Species: O. simiensis

Binomial name
- Otomys simiensis Taylor, Lavrenchenko, Carleton, Verheyen, Bennett, Oosthuizen & Maree, 2011

Species of rodent

The Simien vlei rat (Otomys simiensis) is a species of rodent in the family Muridae. It is found in northern Ethiopia.

== Conservation ==
The species is known from less than 10 locations in Ethiopia. However, it is thought to occur in a protected area, which justified the reasoning behind the "Least Concern" assessment by the IUCN.
