= Anchieta's serotine =

Conservation status
- Least Concern (IUCN 3.1)

Scientific classification
- Kingdom: Animalia
- Phylum: Chordata
- Class: Mammalia
- Order: Chiroptera
- Family: Vespertilionidae
- Genus: Neoromicia
- Species: N. anchietae

Binomial name
- Neoromicia anchietae (Seabra, 1900)
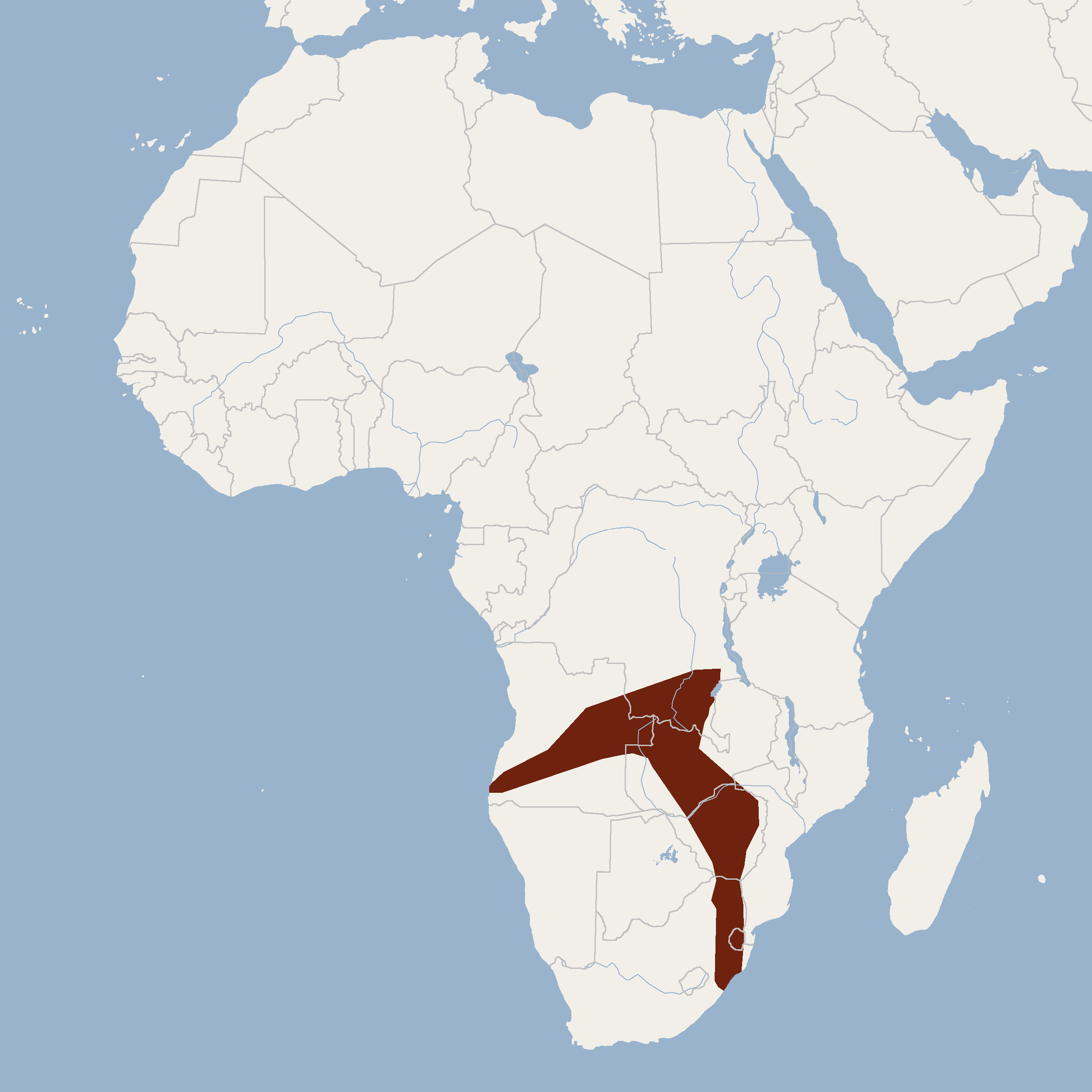

Synonyms
- Vesperugo anchieta Seabra, 1900 (original name); Vesperugo anchietae Seabra, 1900 (emendation); Pipistrellus anchietae Monard, 1935; Pipistrellus anchietai Ellerman et al., 1953 (unjustified emendation); Hypsugo anchietae Kearney, et al., 2002

Species of bat

Anchieta's serotine (Neoromicia anchietae), formerly known as Anchieta's pipistrelle, is a species of vesper bat. It is found in Angola, Democratic Republic of the Congo, South Africa, Zambia, Zimbabwe and Madagascar. The species inhabits savanna habitats.

== Taxonomy and etymology ==
It was described as a new species in 1900 by Antero Frederico de Seabra. Seabra gave it the binomial of Vesperugo anchieta. The specific epithet anchieta was emended to anchietae, which is the current specific epithet. Seabra made an error in his original spelling and corrected it in a later publication in 1900. The holotype had been collected in Cahata, Angola. The eponym for the species name "anchietae" is José Alberto de Oliveira Anchieta, a Portuguese zoologist.

It was formerly classified in the genus Pipistrellus, but phylogenetic evidence supports it belonging in the genus Neoromicia.

== Description ==
It has a head and body length of 40 mm (1.6 in). Its ear is 11 mm (0.43 in) long; its tail is 32 mm (1.3 in) long; its forearm is 35 mm (1.4 in) long.

== Range and habitat ==
It is found in several countries in Africa, including Angola, Democratic Republic of the Congo, South Africa, Zambia, and Zimbabwe. It has also been documented in Madagascar, though observations are rare. It is found in association with riparian habitats, as well as coastal and scrub forests. It has been documented in the Bushveld ecoregion, often near open water.
