= Cheesman's vlei rat =

Conservation status
- Critically endangered, possibly extinct (IUCN 3.1)

Scientific classification
- Kingdom: Animalia
- Phylum: Chordata
- Class: Mammalia
- Order: Rodentia
- Family: Muridae
- Genus: Otomys
- Species: O. cheesmani

Binomial name
- Otomys cheesmani Taylor, Lavrenchenko, Carleton, Verheyen, Bennett, Oosthuizen & Maree, 2011

Species of rodent

The Cheesman's vlei rat (Otomys cheesmani) is a species of rodent in the family Muridae. It is considered endemic to northwestern Ethiopia.

== Conservation ==
It is possibly extinct and only known from two localities in Ethiopia, hence the assessment of the species as "Critically endangered" by the IUCN. Surveys done in 2012 and 2018 found no individuals of the species.
