= Dent's vlei rat =

Conservation status
- Least Concern (IUCN 3.1)

Scientific classification
- Kingdom: Animalia
- Phylum: Chordata
- Class: Mammalia
- Order: Rodentia
- Family: Muridae
- Genus: Otomys
- Species: O. denti

Binomial name
- Otomys denti Thomas, 1906

Species of rodent

Dent's vlei rat (Otomys denti) is a species of rodent in the family Muridae. It is found in Burundi, Democratic Republic of the Congo, Malawi, Tanzania, Uganda, and Zambia. Its natural habitats are subtropical or tropical moist montane forests, subtropical or tropical high-altitude shrubland, and subtropical or tropical high-altitude grassland. It is threatened by habitat loss.
