= Tanzanian vlei rat =

Conservation status
- Least Concern (IUCN 3.1)

Scientific classification
- Kingdom: Animalia
- Phylum: Chordata
- Class: Mammalia
- Order: Rodentia
- Family: Muridae
- Genus: Otomys
- Species: O. lacustris

Binomial name
- Otomys lacustris G.M. Allen & Loveridge, 1933

Species of rodent

The Tanzanian vlei rat (Otomys lacustris) is a species of rodent in the family Muridae. It is found in Kenya, Malawi, and Tanzania. Its natural habitats are subtropical or tropical high-altitude grassland and swamps. It is threatened by habitat loss.
