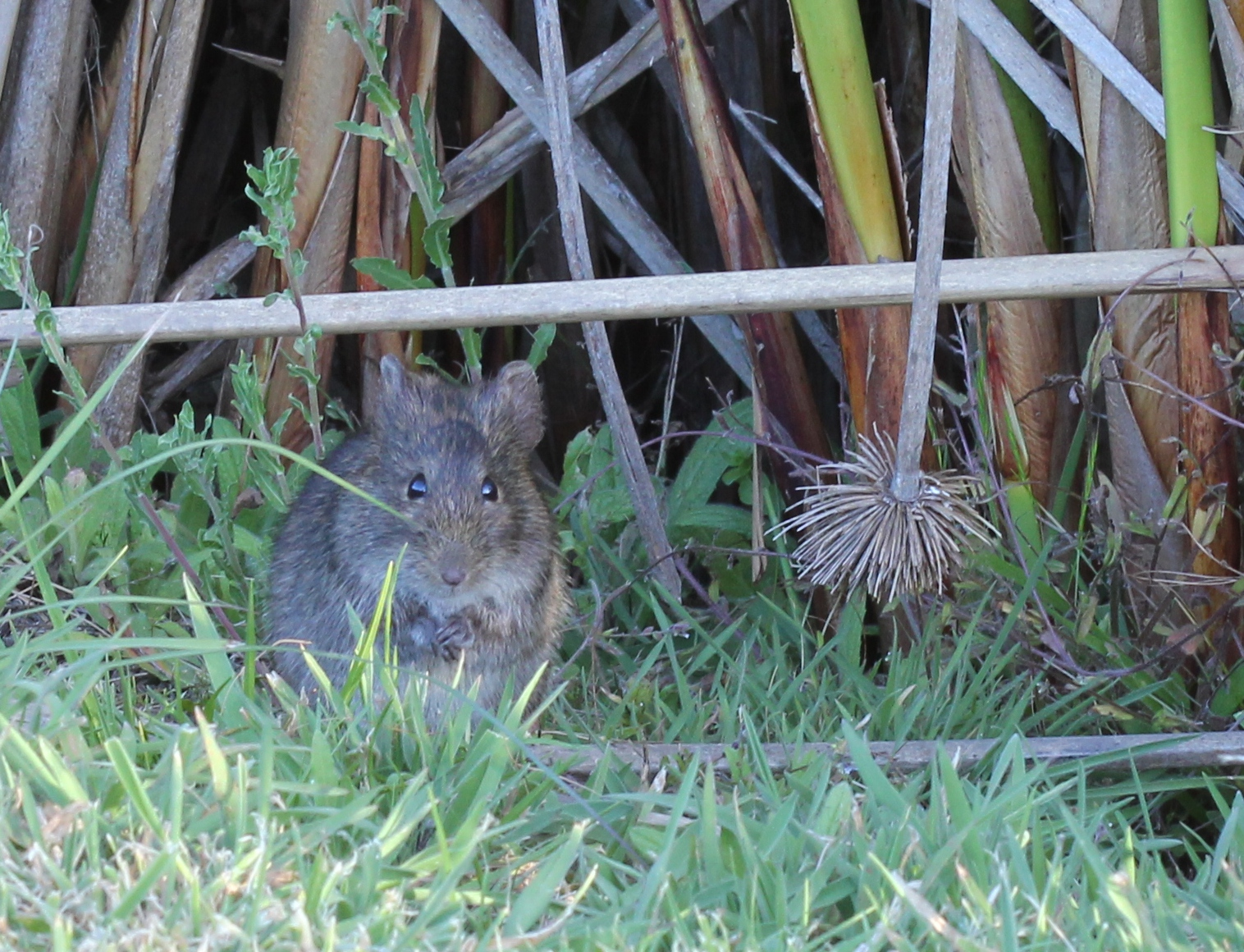
- A southern African vlei rat, grazing beside a reed-fringed dam

Conservation status
- Least Concern (IUCN 3.1)

Scientific classification
- Kingdom: Animalia
- Phylum: Chordata
- Class: Mammalia
- Infraclass: Placentalia
- Order: Rodentia
- Family: Muridae
- Genus: Otomys
- Species: O. irroratus

Binomial name
- Otomys irroratus (Brants, 1827)

= Southern African vlei rat =

Species of rodent

The Southern African vlei rat (Otomys irroratus) is a species of rodent in the vlei rat genus, Otomys, of the family Muridae in the order Rodentia. This is the type species of the genus. It is native to the grasslands and swamps of southern Africa where it is a common species.

== Description ==
The Southern African vlei rat is a large-sized rat with dense and continuously replaced shaggy fur. The head is large, the ears small, and the tail short. The dorsal parts are generally gray, brown, or black. The ventral parts are some shade of paler or darker grey. All of its digits are clawed, and the hind claws are longer than the fore claws. The head-and-body length is about 160 mm (6.3 in) and the tail about 100 mm (4 in). Both males and females have a similar mean mass of 143.7 g.

== Distribution and habitat ==
The range extends from the far South Western Cape of South Africa, around the southern and eastern coast and adjacent interior, to subtropical regions in southern Natal. This part of its range includes Lesotho. Further north, it no longer occurs around the actual coast. Inland however, its range extends north to tropical areas, nearly to the northern boundary of the Transvaal, including parts of Eswatini. An apparently isolated population occurs still further north in tropical eastern Zimbabwe and adjacent Mozambique. Its habitats include temperate low-altitude swamps and grassland, and subtropical and tropical high-altitude grassland, swamps, and plantations. It is a terrestrial species that lives above ground in an open, bowl-shaped nest made of shredded grass near marshy areas with a lot of vegetation.

== Ecology ==
The Southern African vlei rat is mainly active at dusk and dawn. Most are diurnal, although some vlei rats show nocturnal activity. It shares and creates runways with other coexisting species through the vegetation as it forages on the green vegetation on which it feeds.

=== Diet and Feeding strategies ===
The Southern African vlei rat is a cecal digester and strict herbivore. Its diet consists of the stems and leaves of grasses, herbs, shrubs, and grass seeds. However, they are not selective feeders and will eat nearly all green plant species in their habitat. They also gnaw on the bark of pine trees in plantations, damaging the trees. They have adapted some degree of high tolerance for toxic plants. Much of the digestive process takes place in the cecum with the aid of microbes, and the fecal pellets are often re-ingested.

== Life History and Reproduction ==
The Southern African vlei rat is mainly promiscuous in mating, although some populations are polygynous. Females in polygyny mating systems can terminate their pregnancy, which may be a counter-strategy to infanticide. Males and females preferably mate within their own population and discriminate between individuals of another population through their odor. Females may give birth up to four times a year, producing 1-4 offspring, with a gestation period of five to six weeks. In the eastern cape, they breed year long, whereas in Transvaal they mostly breed in August when food is most abundant.

Their young are precocial at birth and are relatively large compared to other similar sized rodents. They are covered with fur and their incisors erupted, which allows them to cling to their mother's nipples as she travels for their first two weeks after birth. By day 2, their eyes are open, they can hear acutely, and can eat solid food. They will eat both their own and others feces to obtain enough nutrients. By day 5, they have coordinated body movement. Approximately by day 13, weaning is complete. They grow rapidly, reaching 71% of adult mass by the time they are 10 weeks old. Females are sexually mature at 9–10 weeks old, but males mature later. They have a lifespan of up to 2 years.

== Behaviors ==
The Southern African vlei rat is a k-strategist, quadrupedal, and can rapidly run along runways. They are able to swim if needed. They often use their forepaws to eat and discard food in piles by runways, as well as grooming and washing their face.

This rat is solitary and aggressive towards other members of the species. Adult males have a home range of about 1,730 m^{2} (18,600 ft^{2}) and maintain a small home territory around the nest site. It communicates through olfactory signals by anal-gland marking of their territory. There is a hierarchy in aggression: males and females who have mated, then males and females who have not mated, respectively. When same-ranking individuals encounter each other, they start fighting and chasing each other, ending in serious wounds until one animals flees or shows submissive behavior. Submissive behaviors include the rats in an upright posture exposing their stomach and chattering.

Since they are non-burrowing, they keep warm through nonshivering thermogenesis and have low thermal conductance. They have low metabolic rates which may be why they can feed on low quality food.

Their predators are barn owls, grass owls, marsh owls, spotted eagle owls, Southern African rock pythons, mole snakes, rinkals, Cape cobras, puff adders, grey herons, black-winged kites, long-crested eagles, servals, wildcats, genets, mongooses, jackals, African polecats, honey badgers, and possibly Cape clawless otters.
