= Uzungwe vlei rat =

Conservation status
- Endangered (IUCN 3.1)

Scientific classification
- Kingdom: Animalia
- Phylum: Chordata
- Class: Mammalia
- Order: Rodentia
- Family: Muridae
- Genus: Otomys
- Species: O. uzungwensis

Binomial name
- Otomys uzungwensis Lawrence & Loveridge, 1953

Species of rodent

The Uzungwe vlei rat (Otomys uzungwensis) is a species of rodent in the family Muridae. It is found in Malawi, Tanzania, and Zambia. Its natural habitats are subtropical or tropical high-altitude grassland and swamps. It is threatened by habitat loss.
