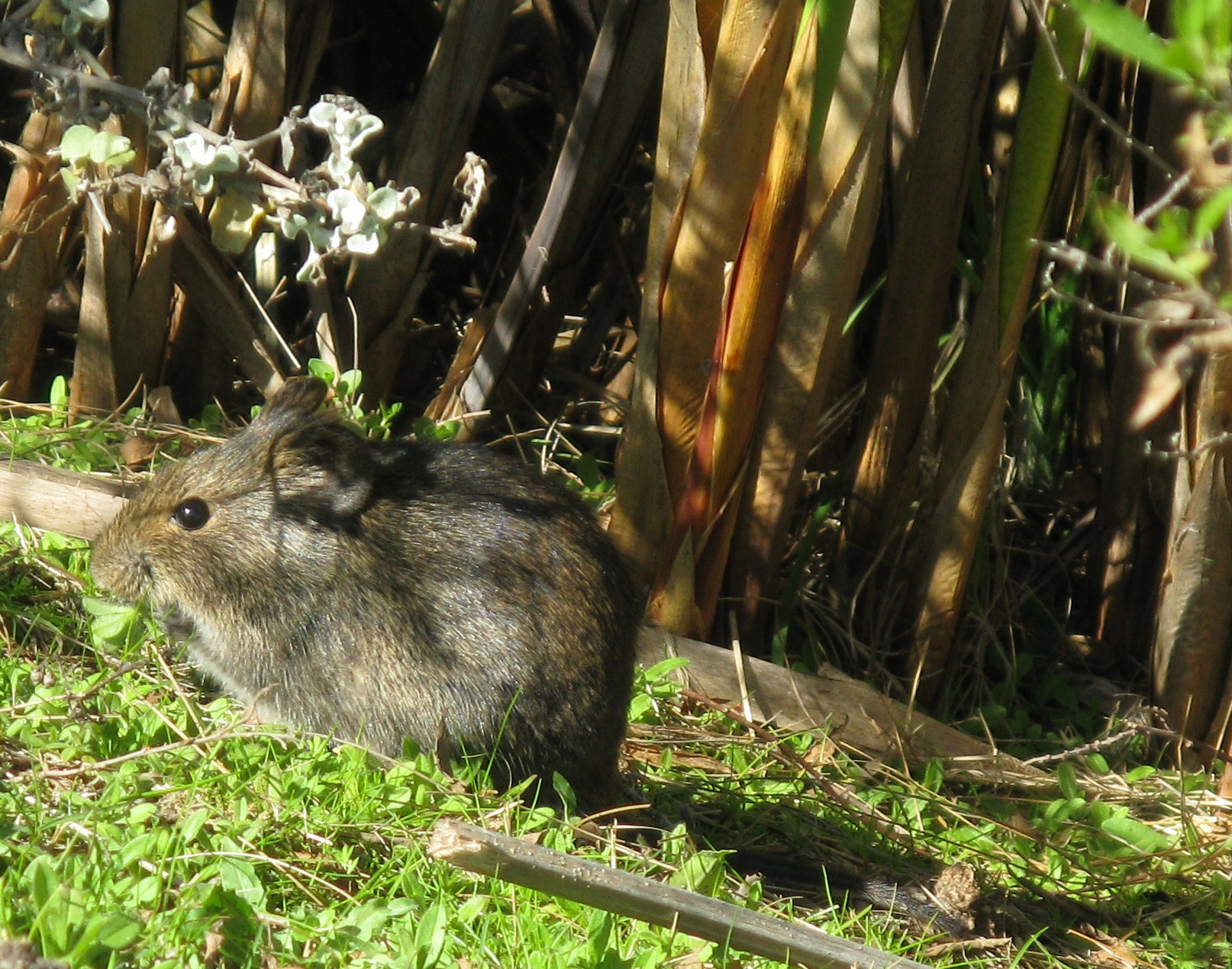
- Otomys irroratus grazing on clover.

Scientific classification
- Domain: Eukaryota
- Kingdom: Animalia
- Phylum: Chordata
- Class: Mammalia
- Order: Rodentia
- Family: Muridae
- Tribe: Otomyini
- Genus: Otomys; F. Cuvier, 1824

Type species
- Euryotis irrorata

Species
- 26, see text

Synonyms
- Anchotomys Thomas, 1918; Euryotis Brants, 1827; Lamotomys Thomas, 1918; Oreinomys Trouessart, 1880; Oreomys Heuglin, 1877; Palaeotomys Broom, 1937; Prototomys Broom, 1948

= Otomys =

African vlei rats Temporal range: Late Pliocene - Recent

Genus of rodents

African vlei rats (Otomys), also known as groove-toothed rats, live in many areas of sub-Saharan Africa. Most species live in marshlands, grasslands, and similar habitats and feed on the vegetation of such areas, occasionally supplementing it with roots and seeds. The name "vlei" refers to the South African term for intermittent, seasonal, or perennial bodies of standing water.

Otomys are compact rodents with a tendency to shorter faces and legs than other types of rats. The tails also are shorter than most Muridae, typically between one third and two thirds of the body length. The coat colour varies according to species, but generally they have the brown-to-grey agouti coats typical of mice and other small wild rodents. Species living in warm or temperate regions tend to have unusually large ears for murids (e.g. Otomys irroratus), whereas some of the alpine species, such as Otomys sloggetti have markedly smaller ears. (However, the latter species may no longer belong in the genus Otomys.)

Depending on the species adult Otomys have a body length between 12 and 22 cm (5–9 inches) and weigh 90 to 260 grams (3–9 oz).

== Species ==
Genus Otomys - groove-toothed or vlei rats

- Angolan vlei rat, Otomys anchietae
- Angoni vlei rat, Otomys angoniensis
- Barbour's vlei rat, Otomys barbouri
- Burton's vlei rat, Otomys burtoni
- Cheesman's vlei rat, Otomys cheesmani
- Cuanza vlei rat, Otomys cuanzensis
- Ruwenzori vlei rat, Otomys dartmouthi
- Dent's vlei rat, Otomys denti
- Dollman's vlei rat, Otomys dollmani
- Charada vlei rat, Otomys fortior
- Heller's vlei rat, Otomys helleri
- Southern African vlei rat, Otomys irroratus
- Mount Elgon vlei rat, Otomys jacksoni
- Tanzanian vlei rat, Otomys lacustris
- Laminate vlei rat, Otomys laminatus
- Large vlei rat, Otomys maximus
- Western vlei rat, Otomys occidentalis
- Afroalpine vlei rat, Otomys orestes
- Saunder's vlei rat, Otomys saundersiae
- Simien vlei rat, Otomys simiensis
- Thomas's vlei rat, Otomys thomasi
- Tropical vlei rat, Otomys tropicalis
- Ethiopian vlei rat, Otomys typus
- Uzungwe vlei rat, Otomys uzungwensis
- Yalden's vlei rat, Otomys yaldeni
- Mount Kilimanjaro vlei rat, Otomys zinki
