= List of myosoricines =

Species in mammal subfamily Myosoricinae

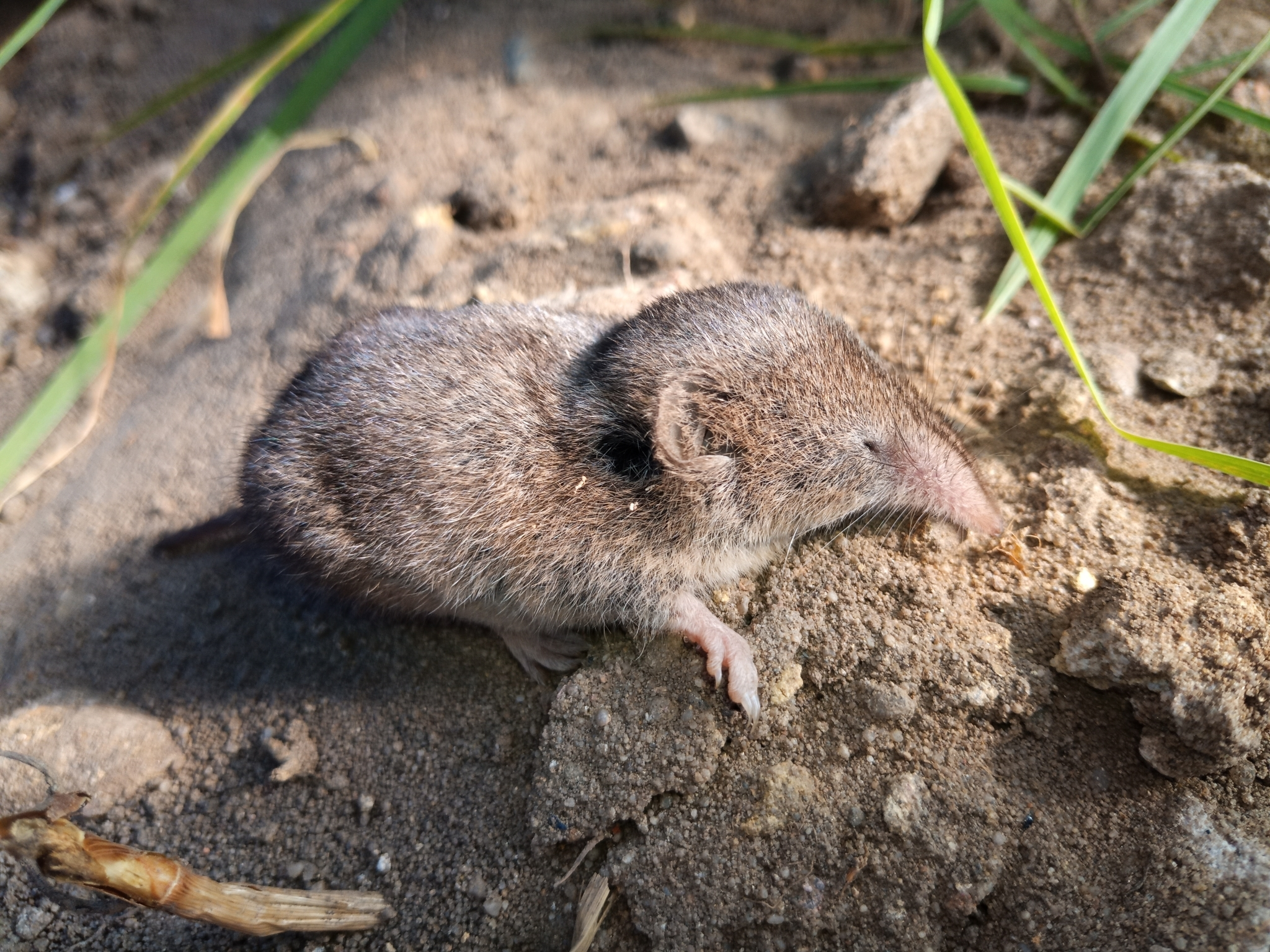
Forest shrew (Myosorex varius)

Myosoricinae is a subfamily of small mammals in the shrew family Soricidae, which in turn is part of the order Eulipotyphla. A member of this family is called a myosoricine, or an African shrew. Myosoricinae is one of three subfamilies in Soricidae, along with the white-toothed shrews of Crocidurinae and the red-toothed shrews of Soricinae. They are found in central and southern Africa, primarily in forests, and also in shrublands, grasslands, and wetlands. They range in size from the lesser Congo shrew, at 5 cm (2 in) plus a 1 cm (0.4 in) tail, to various members of the Myosorex and Surdisorex genera, at 11 cm (4 in) plus a 7 cm (3 in) tail. Myosoricines primarily eat insects and other invertebrates, as well as small birds and mammals. No myosoricines have population estimates, but 7 species are categorized as endangered species: the Geata mouse shrew, Kihaule's mouse shrew, long-tailed forest shrew, montane mouse shrew, Nyika burrowing shrew, Rumpi mouse shrew, and thin mouse shrew. Additionally, the Phillips' Congo shrew and Eisentraut's mouse shrew are categorized as critically endangered.

The 25 extant species of Myosoricinae are divided into three genera; 19 of them are in Myosorex and 3 each are in Congosorex and Surdisorex. A few extinct prehistoric Myosoricinae species have been discovered, though due to ongoing research and discoveries the exact number and categorization is not fixed.

== Conventions ==
IUCN Red List categories
Conservation status
- EX: Extinct (0 species)
- EW: Extinct in the wild (0 species)
- CR: Critically endangered (2 species)
- EN: Endangered (7 species)
- VU: Vulnerable (4 species)
- NT: Near threatened (9 species)
- LC: Least concern (6 species)

Other categories
- DD: Data deficient (5 species)
- NE: Not evaluated (0 species)

The author citation for the species or genus is given after the scientific name; parentheses around the author citation indicate that this was not the original taxonomic placement. Conservation status codes listed follow the International Union for Conservation of Nature (IUCN) Red List of Threatened Species. Range maps are provided wherever possible; if a range map is not available, a description of the myosoricine's range is provided. Ranges are based on the IUCN Red List for that species unless otherwise noted.

== Classification ==
The subfamily Myosoricinae consists of twenty-five extant species in three genera: Myosorex, containing 19 species, and Congosorex and Surdisorex with three species each.

Subfamily Myosoricinae

- Genus Congosorex (Congo shrews): three species
- Genus Myosorex (mouse shrews): nineteen species
- Genus Surdisorex (African mole shrews): three species

== Myosoricines ==
The following classification is based on the taxonomy described by the reference work Mammal Species of the World (2005), with augmentation by generally accepted proposals made since using molecular phylogenetic analysis, as supported by both the IUCN and the American Society of Mammalogists.

Genus Congosorex – Heim de Balsac & Lamotte, 1956 – three species
Common name	Scientific name and subspecies	Range	Size and ecology	IUCN status and estimated population
Greater Congo shrew	C. polli (Heim de Balsac & Lamotte, 1956)	Democratic Republic of the Congo	Size: About 6 cm (2 in) long, plus 2 cm (1 in) tail Habitat: Forest Diet: Invertebrates	DD Unknown
Lesser Congo shrew	C. verheyeni Hutterer, Barriere, & Colyn, 2002	West-central Africa	Size: 5–10 cm (2–4 in) long, plus 1–3 cm (0.4–1.2 in) tail Habitat: Forest Diet: Invertebrates	LC Unknown
Phillips' Congo shrew	C. phillipsorum Stanley, Rogers, & Hutterer, 2005	Tanzania	Size: 6–8 cm (2–3 in) long, plus 3–4 cm (1–2 in) tail Habitat: Forest Diet: Invertebrates	CR Unknown

Genus Myosorex – Gray, 1838 – nineteen species
Common name	Scientific name and subspecies	Range	Size and ecology	IUCN status and estimated population
Babault's mouse shrew	M. babaulti Heim de Balsac & Lamotte, 1956	Central Africa	Size: 6–11 cm (2–4 in) long, plus 2–7 cm (1–3 in) tail Habitat: Forest and inland wetlands Diet: Insects, as well as small birds and mammals	LC Unknown
Bururi forest shrew	M. bururiensis Kerbis Peterhans et al., 2010	Burundi	Size: 6–11 cm (2–4 in) long, plus 2–7 cm (1–3 in) tail Habitat: Forest Diet: Insects, as well as small birds and mammals	VU Unknown
Dark-footed mouse shrew	M. cafer (Sundevall, 1846)	Southern Africa	Size: 6–11 cm (2–4 in) long, plus 2–7 cm (1–3 in) tail Habitat: Forest Diet: Insects, as well as small birds and mammals	VU Unknown
Eisentraut's mouse shrew	M. eisentrauti Heim de Balsac, 1968	Bioko island in Equatorial Guinea	Size: 7–9 cm (3–4 in) long, plus 3–5 cm (1–2 in) tail Habitat: Forest Diet: Insects, as well as small birds and mammals	CR Unknown
Forest shrew	M. varius (Smuts, 1832)	Southern Africa	Size: 7–9 cm (3–4 in) long, plus 3–5 cm (1–2 in) tail Habitat: Forest, savanna, shrubland, and grassland Diet: A variety of invertebrates	LC Unknown
Geata mouse shrew	M. geata (Allen & Loveridge, 1927)	Tanzania	Size: 6–8 cm (2–3 in) long, plus 4–5 cm (2–2 in) tail Habitat: Forest Diet: Insects, as well as small birds and mammals	EN Unknown
Kabogo mouse shrew	M. kabogoensis Kerbis Peterhans & Hutterer, 2013	Democratic Republic of the Congo	Size: 6–11 cm (2–4 in) long, plus 2–7 cm (1–3 in) tail Habitat: Forest Diet: Insects, as well as small birds and mammals	DD Unknown
Kahuzi swamp shrew	M. jejei Kerbis Peterhans et al., 2010	Democratic Republic of the Congo	Size: 6–11 cm (2–4 in) long, plus 2–7 cm (1–3 in) tail Habitat: Forest and inland wetlands Diet: Insects, as well as small birds and mammals	NT Unknown
Kihaule's mouse shrew	M. kihaulei Stanley, 2000	Tanzania	Size: 7–9 cm (3–4 in) long, plus 3–5 cm (1–2 in) tail Habitat: Forest Diet: Insects, as well as small birds and mammals	EN Unknown
Kilimanjaro mouse shrew	M. zinki Heim de Balsac & Lamotte, 1956	Tanzania	Size: 8–10 cm (3–4 in) long, plus 3–5 cm (1–2 in) tail Habitat: Forest, shrubland, grassland, and inland wetlands Diet: Insects, as well as small birds and mammals	LC Unknown
Long-tailed forest shrew	M. longicaudatus Dippenaar & Meester, 1978 Two subspecies: M. l. boosmani; M. l. longicaudatus	South Africa	Size: 7–9 cm (3–4 in) long, plus 4–8 cm (2–3 in) tail Habitat: Forest, inland wetlands, and shrubland Diet: Insects and seeds	EN Unknown
Meester's forest shrew	M. meesteri Taylor, Kearney, Kerbis Peterhans, Baxter, & Willows-Munro, 2013	Southeastern Africa	Size: 6–11 cm (2–4 in) long, plus 2–7 cm (1–3 in) tail Habitat: Forest and grassland Diet: Insects, as well as small birds and mammals	LC Unknown
Montane mouse shrew	M. blarina Thomas, 1906	Uganda	Size: 6–11 cm (2–4 in) long, plus 2–7 cm (1–3 in) tail Habitat: Forest and inland wetlands Diet: Insects, as well as small birds and mammals	EN Unknown
Nyika burrowing shrew	M. gnoskei Kerbis Peterhans, Hutterer, Kaliba, & Mazibuko, 2008	Malawi	Size: 6–11 cm (2–4 in) long, plus 2–7 cm (1–3 in) tail Habitat: Forest and shrubland Diet: Insects, as well as small birds and mammals	EN Unknown
Oku mouse shrew	M. okuensis Heim de Balsac, 1968	Cameroon	Size: 6–11 cm (2–4 in) long, plus 2–7 cm (1–3 in) tail Habitat: Forest Diet: Insects, as well as small birds and mammals	VU Unknown
Rumpi mouse shrew	M. rumpii Heim de Balsac, 1968	Cameroon	Size: 6–11 cm (2–4 in) long, plus 2–7 cm (1–3 in) tail Habitat: Forest Diet: Insects, as well as small birds and mammals	EN Unknown
Schaller's mouse shrew	M. schalleri Heim de Balsac, 1966	Democratic Republic of Congo	Size: 6–11 cm (2–4 in) long, plus 2–7 cm (1–3 in) tail Habitat: Forest Diet: Insects, as well as small birds and mammals	DD Unknown
Sclater's mouse shrew	M. sclateri Thomas & Schwann, 1905	South Africa	Size: 6–11 cm (2–4 in) long, plus 2–7 cm (1–3 in) tail Habitat: Inland wetlands and forest Diet: Insects, as well as small birds and mammals	VU Unknown
Thin mouse shrew	M. tenuis Thomas & Schwann, 1905	South Africa	Size: 7–10 cm (3–4 in) long, plus 3–5 cm (1–2 in) tail Habitat: Grassland Diet: Insects, as well as small birds and mammals	EN Unknown

Genus Surdisorex – Thomas, 1906 – three species
Common name	Scientific name and subspecies	Range	Size and ecology	IUCN status and estimated population
Aberdare mole shrew	S. norae Thomas, 1906	Kenya	Size: 6–11 cm (2–4 in) long, plus 2–7 cm (1–3 in) tail Habitat: Grassland Diet: Earthworms, as well as insects, small birds, and mammals	LC Unknown
Mount Elgon mole shrew	S. schlitteri Kerbis Peterhans, Stanley, Hutterer, Demos, & Agwanda, 2009	Kenya	Size: 6–11 cm (2–4 in) long, plus 2–7 cm (1–3 in) tail Habitat: Shrubland Diet: Insects, as well as small birds and mammals	DD Unknown
Mount Kenya mole shrew	S. polulus Hollister, 1916	Kenya	Size: 6–11 cm (2–4 in) long, plus 2–7 cm (1–3 in) tail Habitat: Grassland Diet: Earthworms, as well as insects, small birds, and mammals	DD Unknown

== Sources ==
- Kingdon, Jonathan (2014). Mammals of Africa. Vol. IV: Hedgehogs, Shrews and Bats. A & C Black. ISBN 978-1-4081-8993-1.
- Nowak, Ronald M. (1999). Walker's Mammals of the World. Vol. 1. Johns Hopkins University Press. ISBN 978-0-8018-5789-8.
- Hutterer, Rainer (2005). Wilson, Don E.; Reeder, DeeAnn M. (eds.). Mammal Species of the World. Vol. 1 (3rd ed.). Johns Hopkins University Press. ISBN 978-0-8018-8221-0.
