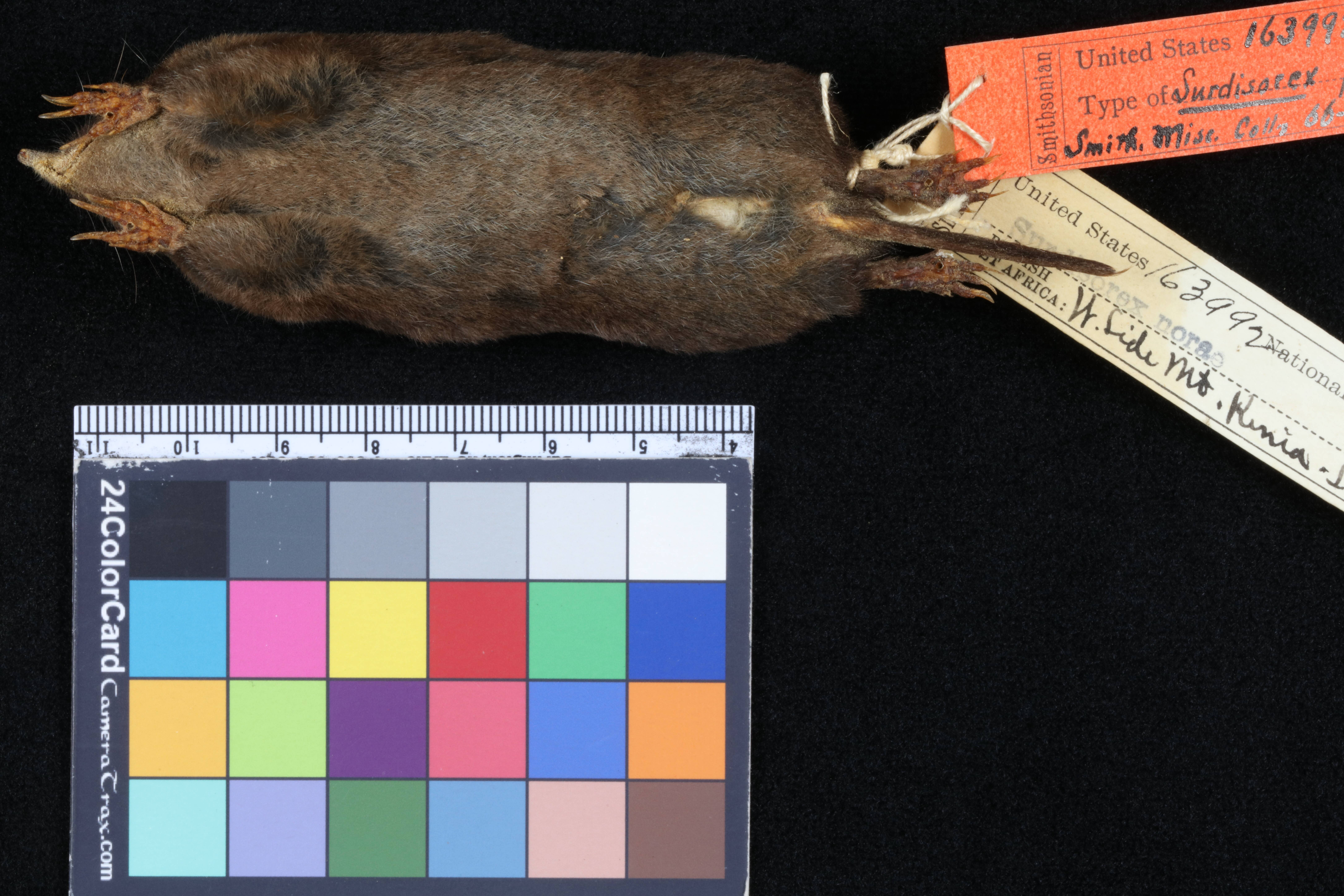
- Surdisorex polulus

Scientific classification
- Kingdom: Animalia
- Phylum: Chordata
- Class: Mammalia
- Order: Eulipotyphla
- Family: Soricidae
- Subfamily: Myosoricinae; Kretzoi, 1965

Genera
- Congosorex; Myosorex; Surdisorex; Nagasorex?

= Myosoricinae =

Subfamily of mammals

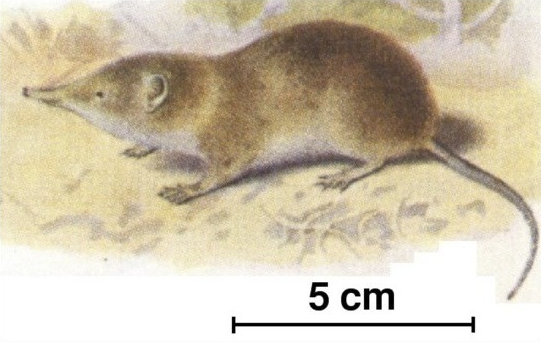
Myosorex varius is a forest shrew in the subfamily Myosoricinae

According to the current taxonomy, the Myosoricinae are a subfamily of shrews. As such, they form one of three main types of shrews, the other two being the red-toothed shrews and the white-toothed shrews. They are the only one of the three to be found exclusively south of the Sahara Desert, and so they have been described in English as the African shrews, but also many white-toothed shrews are in Africa and therefore this term is more generally used for shrews from Africa in general. (Another vernacular term is African white-toothed shrews, though this perpetuates the same confusion.)

The Asian Nagasorex may also be part of this subfamily.

== Classification ==
The subfamily has three genera and 20 species:

- Subfamily Myosoricinae
  - Genus Congosorex - Congo shrews
    - Phillips' Congo shrew, C. phillipsorum
    - Greater Congo shrew, C. polli
    - Lesser Congo shrew, C. verheyeni
  - Genus Myosorex - forest and mouse shrews
    - Babault's mouse shrew, M. babaulti
    - Montane mouse shrew, M. blarina
    - Bururi forest shrew, M. bururiensis
    - Dark-footed mouse shrew, M. cafer
    - Eisentraut's mouse shrew, M. eisentrauti
    - Geata mouse shrew, M. geata
    - Nyika mouse shrew or Nyika burrowing shrew, M. gnoskei
    - Kahuzi swamp shrew, M. jejei
    - Kabogo mouse shrew M. kabogoensis
    - Kihaule's mouse shrew, M. kihaulei
    - Long-tailed forest shrew, M. longicaudatus
    - Meester's forest shrew, M. meesteri
    - Oku mouse shrew, M. okuensis
    - Rumpi mouse shrew, M. rumpii
    - Schaller's mouse shrew, M. schalleri
    - Sclater's mouse shrew, M. sclateri
    - Thin mouse shrew, M. tenuis
    - Forest shrew, M. varius
    - Kilimanjaro mouse shrew, M. zinki
  - Genus Surdisorex - African mole shrews
    - Aberdare mole shrew, S. norae
    - Mount Kenya mole shrew, S. polulus
    - Mount Elgon mole shrew, S. schlitteri

According to Furió et al.(2007) the group should have the status of tribe, as a relict of the primitive subfamily Crocidosoricinae.
