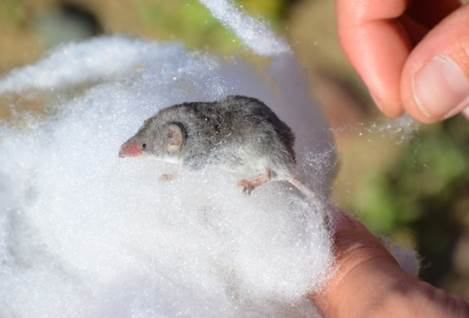
- Crawford's gray shrew (Notiosorex crawfordi)

Scientific classification
- Domain: Eukaryota
- Kingdom: Animalia
- Phylum: Chordata
- Class: Mammalia
- Order: Eulipotyphla
- Family: Soricidae
- Subfamily: Soricinae
- Tribe: Notiosoricini

Genera
- See text

= Notiosoricini =

Tribe of mammals

Notiosoricini, whose members are known as the North American gray shrews, is a tribe of shrews in the family Soricidae, including the genera Megasorex and Notiosorex. They are found across the southwestern United States and most of Mexico.

The tribe includes the following species:

- Genus Megasorex
  - Mexican shrew, M. gigas
- Genus Notiosorex
  - Cockrum's gray shrew, N. cockrumi
  - Crawford's gray shrew, N. crawfordi
  - Large-eared gray shrew, N. evotis
  - Villa's gray shrew, N. villai
