= List of mammals of Eswatini =

This is a list of the mammal species recorded in Eswatini. There are 107 mammal species in Eswatini, of which one is critically endangered, two are endangered, five are vulnerable, and four are near threatened.

The following tags are used to highlight each species' conservation status as assessed by the International Union for Conservation of Nature:

EX	Extinct	No reasonable doubt that the last individual has died.
EW	Extinct in the wild	Known only to survive in captivity or as a naturalized populations well outside its previous range.
CR	Critically endangered	The species is in imminent risk of extinction in the wild.
EN	Endangered	The species is facing an extremely high risk of extinction in the wild.
VU	Vulnerable	The species is facing a high risk of extinction in the wild.
NT	Near threatened	The species does not meet any of the criteria that would categorise it as risking extinction but it is likely to do so in the future.
LC	Least concern	There are no current identifiable risks to the species.
DD	Data deficient	There is inadequate information to make an assessment of the risks to this species.

Some species were assessed using an earlier set of criteria. Species assessed using this system have the following instead of near threatened and least concern categories:

LR/cd	Lower risk/conservation dependent	Species which were the focus of conservation programmes and may have moved into a higher risk category if that programme was discontinued.
LR/nt	Lower risk/near threatened	Species which are close to being classified as vulnerable but are not the subject of conservation programmes.
LR/lc	Lower risk/least concern	Species for which there are no identifiable risks.

== Order: Afrosoricida (tenrecs and golden moles) ==
The order Afrosoricida contains the golden moles of southern Africa and the tenrecs of Madagascar and Africa, two families of small mammals that were traditionally part of the order Insectivora.

- Family: Chrysochloridae
  - Subfamily: Amblysominae
    - Genus: Amblysomus
      - Hottentot golden mole, Amblysomus hottentotus LC
      - Marley's golden mole, Amblysomus marleyi EN
      - Highveld golden mole, Amblysomus septentrionalis NT

== Order: Pholidota (pangolins) ==
The order Pholidota comprises the eight species of pangolin. Pangolins are anteaters and have the powerful claws, elongated snout and long tongue seen in the other unrelated anteater species.

- Family: Manidae
  - Genus: Smutsia
    - Ground pangolin, S. temminckii VU possibly extirpated

== Order: Hyracoidea (hyraxes) ==
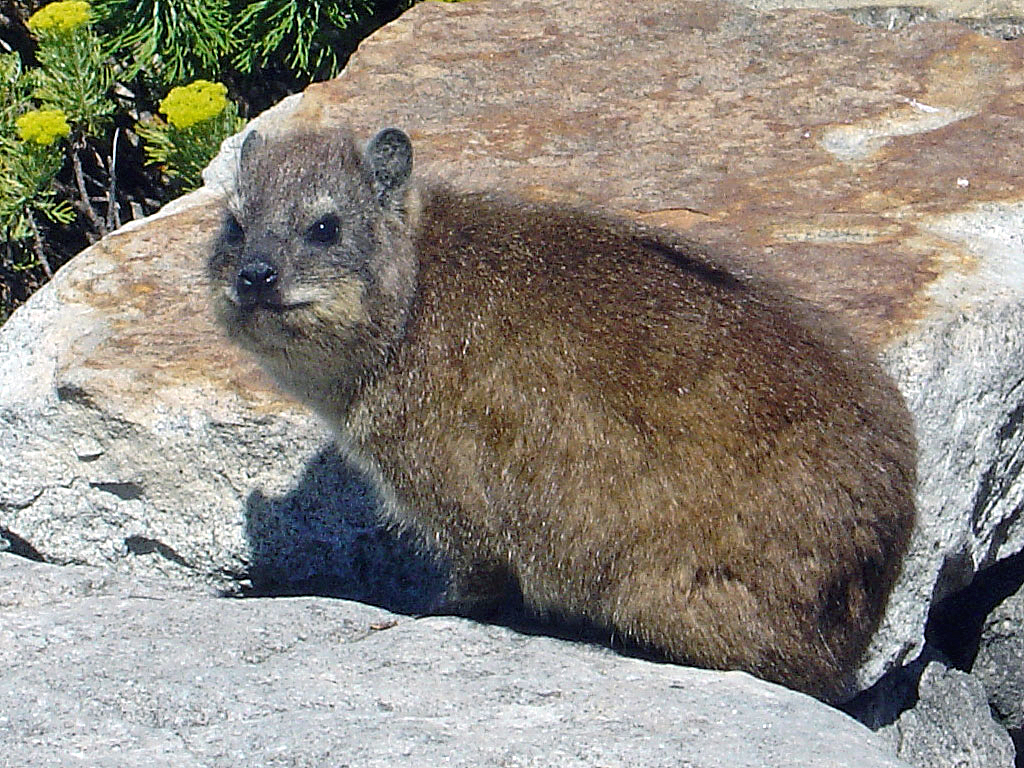
Cape hyrax

The hyraxes are any of four species of fairly small, thickset, herbivorous mammals in the order Hyracoidea. About the size of a domestic cat they are well-furred, with rounded bodies and a stumpy tail. They are native to Africa and the Middle East.

- Family: Procaviidae (hyraxes)
  - Genus: Procavia
    - Cape hyrax, P. capensis LC

== Order: Proboscidea (elephants) ==
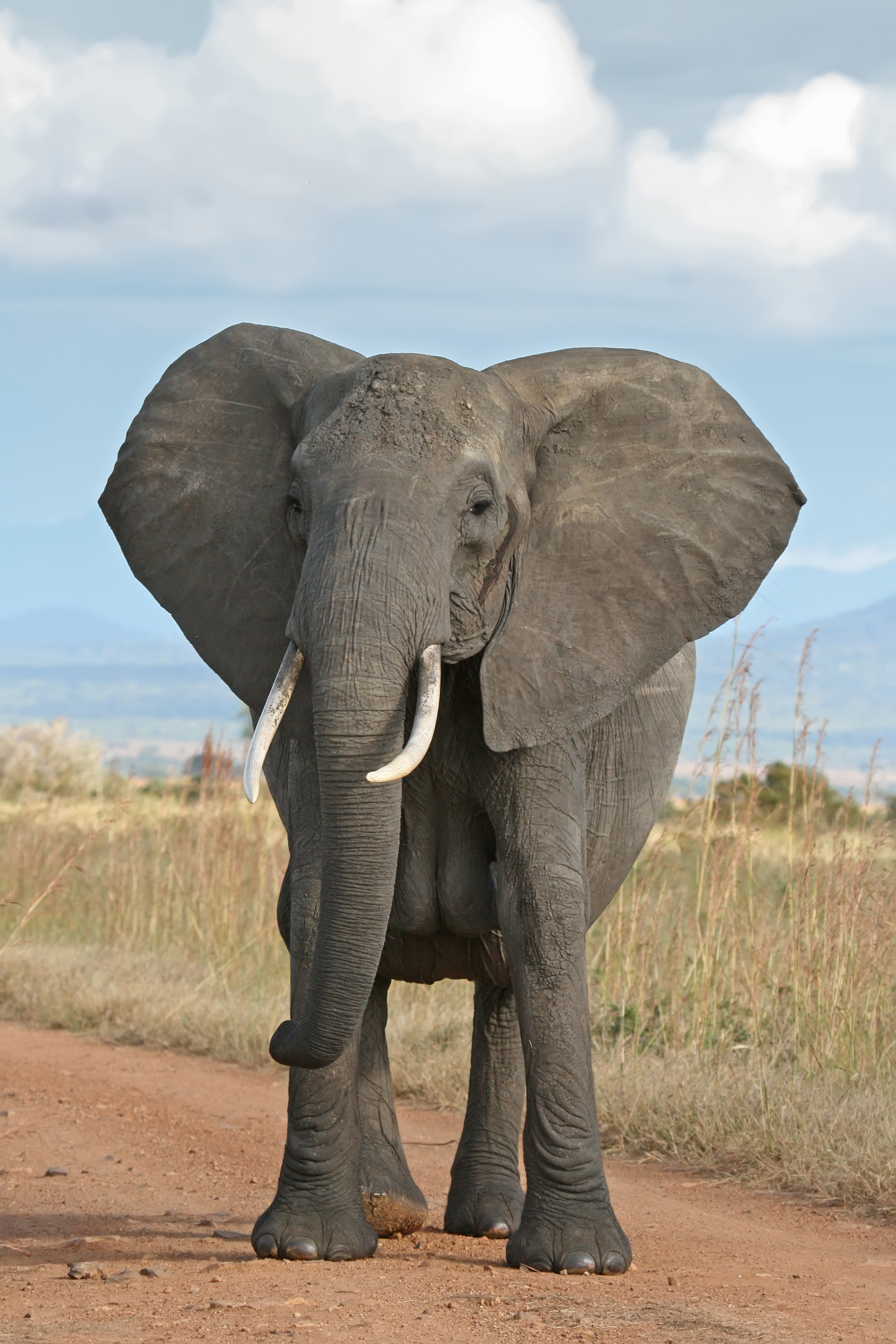
African bush elephant

The elephants comprise three living species and are the largest living land animals.

- Family: Elephantidae (elephants)
  - Genus: Loxodonta
    - African bush elephant, L. africana EN reintroduced

== Order: Primates ==
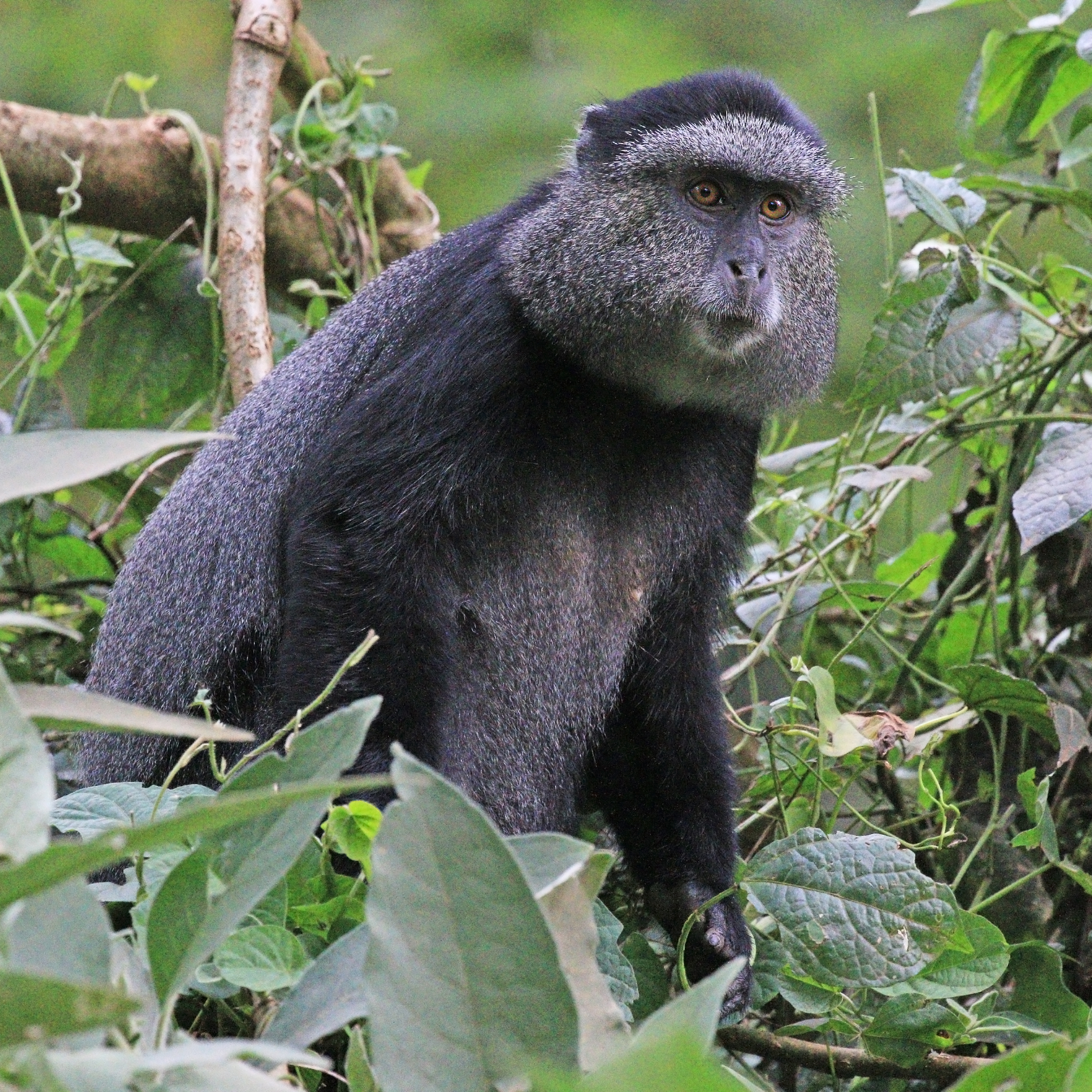
Blue monkey

The order Primates contains humans and their closest relatives: lemurs, lorisoids, tarsiers, monkeys, and apes.

- Suborder: Strepsirrhini
  - Infraorder: Lemuriformes
    - Superfamily: Lorisidae
      - Family: Galagidae
        - Genus: Galago
          - Mohol bushbaby, G. moholi LC
        - Genus: Otolemur
          - Brown greater galago, Otolemur crassicaudatus LR/lc
- Suborder: Haplorhini
  - Infraorder: Simiiformes
    - Parvorder: Catarrhini
      - Superfamily: Cercopithecoidea
        - Family: Cercopithecidae (Old World monkeys)
          - Genus: Chlorocebus
            - Vervet monkey, Chlorocebus pygerythrus LR/lc
          - Genus: Cercopithecus
            - Blue monkey, Cercopithecus mitis LR/lc
          - Genus: Papio
            - Chacma baboon, Papio ursinus LR/lc

== Order: Rodentia (rodents) ==
Rodents make up the largest order of mammals, with over 40% of mammalian species. They have two incisors in the upper and lower jaw which grow continually and must be kept short by gnawing. Most rodents are small though the capybara can weigh up to 45 kg (99 lb).

- Suborder: Hystricognathi
  - Family: Bathyergidae
    - Genus: Cryptomys
      - Common mole-rat, Cryptomys hottentotus LC
  - Family: Hystricidae (Old World porcupines)
    - Genus: Hystrix
      - Cape porcupine, Hystrix africaeaustralis LC
  - Family: Thryonomyidae (cane rats)
    - Genus: Thryonomys
      - Greater cane rat, Thryonomys swinderianus LC
- Suborder: Sciurognathi
  - Family: Gliridae (dormice)
    - Subfamily: Graphiurinae
      - Genus: Graphiurus
        - Small-eared dormouse, Graphiurus microtis LC
        - Rock dormouse, Graphiurus platyops LC
  - Family: Nesomyidae
    - Subfamily: Dendromurinae
      - Genus: Dendromus
        - Gray climbing mouse, Dendromus melanotis LC
        - Chestnut climbing mouse, Dendromus mystacalis LC
    - Subfamily: Cricetomyinae
      - Genus: Saccostomus
        - South African pouched mouse, Saccostomus campestris LC
  - Family: Muridae (mice, rats, voles, gerbils, hamsters, etc.)
    - Subfamily: Otomyinae
      - Genus: Otomys
        - Angoni vlei rat, Otomys angoniensis LC
        - Vlei rat, Otomys irroratus LC
    - Subfamily: Gerbillinae
      - Genus: Tatera
        - Highveld gerbil, Tatera brantsii LC
        - Bushveld gerbil, Tatera leucogaster LC
    - Subfamily: Murinae
      - Genus: Aethomys
        - Tete veld aethomys, Aethomys ineptus LC
        - Namaqua rock rat, Aethomys namaquensis LC
      - Genus: Grammomys
        - Woodland thicket rat, Grammomys dolichurus LC
      - Genus: Lemniscomys
        - Single-striped grass mouse, Lemniscomys rosalia LC
      - Genus: Mastomys
        - Natal multimammate mouse, Mastomys natalensis LC
      - Genus: Mus
        - African pygmy mouse, Mus minutoides LC
      - Genus: Rhabdomys
        - Four-striped grass mouse, Rhabdomys pumilio LC
      - Genus: Thallomys
        - Acacia rat, Thallomys paedulcus LC

== Order: Lagomorpha (lagomorphs) ==
The lagomorphs comprise two families, Leporidae (hares and rabbits), and Ochotonidae (pikas). Though they can resemble rodents, and were classified as a superfamily in that order until the early 20th century, they have since been considered a separate order. They differ from rodents in a number of physical characteristics, such as having four incisors in the upper jaw rather than two.

- Family: Leporidae (rabbits, hares)
  - Genus: Lepus
    - Cape hare, Lepus capensis LR/lc
    - African savanna hare, Lepus microtis LR/lc

== Order: Soricomorpha (shrews, moles, and solenodons) ==
The "shrew-forms" are insectivorous mammals. The shrews and solenodons closely resemble mice while the moles are stout-bodied burrowers.

- Family: Soricidae (shrews)
  - Subfamily: Crocidurinae
    - Genus: Crocidura
      - Reddish-gray musk shrew, Crocidura cyanea LC
      - Greater red musk shrew, Crocidura flavescens LC
      - Lesser red musk shrew, Crocidura hirta LC
      - Maquassie musk shrew, Crocidura maquassiensis LC
      - Swamp musk shrew, Crocidura mariquensis LC
      - Lesser gray-brown musk shrew, Crocidura silacea LC
    - Genus: Suncus
      - Least dwarf shrew, Suncus infinitesimus LC
  - Subfamily: Myosoricinae
    - Genus: Myosorex
      - Dark-footed forest shrew, Myosorex cafer LC
      - Forest shrew, Myosorex varius LC

== Order: Chiroptera (bats) ==
The bats' most distinguishing feature is that their forelimbs are developed as wings, making them the only mammals capable of flight. Bat species account for about 20% of all mammals.

- Family: Pteropodidae (flying foxes, Old World fruit bats)
  - Subfamily: Pteropodinae
    - Genus: Eidolon
      - Straw-coloured fruit bat, Eidolon helvum LC
    - Genus: Epomophorus
      - Peters's epauletted fruit bat, Epomophorus crypturus LC
      - Wahlberg's epauletted fruit bat, Epomophorus wahlbergi LC
    - Genus: Rousettus
      - Egyptian fruit bat, Rousettus aegyptiacus LC
- Family: Vespertilionidae
  - Subfamily: Kerivoulinae
    - Genus: Kerivoula
      - Damara woolly bat, Kerivoula argentata LC
  - Subfamily: Myotinae
    - Genus: Myotis
      - Cape hairy bat, Myotis tricolor LC
  - Subfamily: Vespertilioninae
    - Genus: Glauconycteris
      - Butterfly bat, Glauconycteris variegata LC
    - Genus: Neoromicia
      - Cape serotine, Neoromicia capensis LC
      - Banana pipistrelle, Neoromicia nanus LC
    - Genus: Nycticeinops
      - Schlieffen's bat, Nycticeinops schlieffeni LC
    - Genus: Scotophilus
      - African yellow bat, Scotophilus dinganii LC
  - Subfamily: Miniopterinae
    - Genus: Miniopterus
      - Lesser long-fingered bat, Miniopterus fraterculus LC
      - Natal long-fingered bat, Miniopterus natalensis NT
- Family: Molossidae
  - Genus: Chaerephon
    - Little free-tailed bat, Chaerephon pumila LC
  - Genus: Mops
    - Angolan free-tailed bat, Mops condylurus LC
- Family: Emballonuridae
  - Genus: Taphozous
    - Mauritian tomb bat, Taphozous mauritianus LC
- Family: Nycteridae
  - Genus: Nycteris
    - Egyptian slit-faced bat, Nycteris thebaica LC
- Family: Rhinolophidae
  - Subfamily: Rhinolophinae
    - Genus: Rhinolophus
      - Blasius's horseshoe bat, R. blasii LC
      - Geoffroy's horseshoe bat, Rhinolophus clivosus LC
      - Darling's horseshoe bat, Rhinolophus darlingi LC
      - Bushveld horseshoe bat, Rhinolophus simulator LC
  - Subfamily: Hipposiderinae
    - Genus: Cloeotis
      - Percival's trident bat, Cloeotis percivali VU
    - Genus: Hipposideros
      - Sundevall's roundleaf bat, Hipposideros caffer LC

== Order: Carnivora (carnivorans) ==
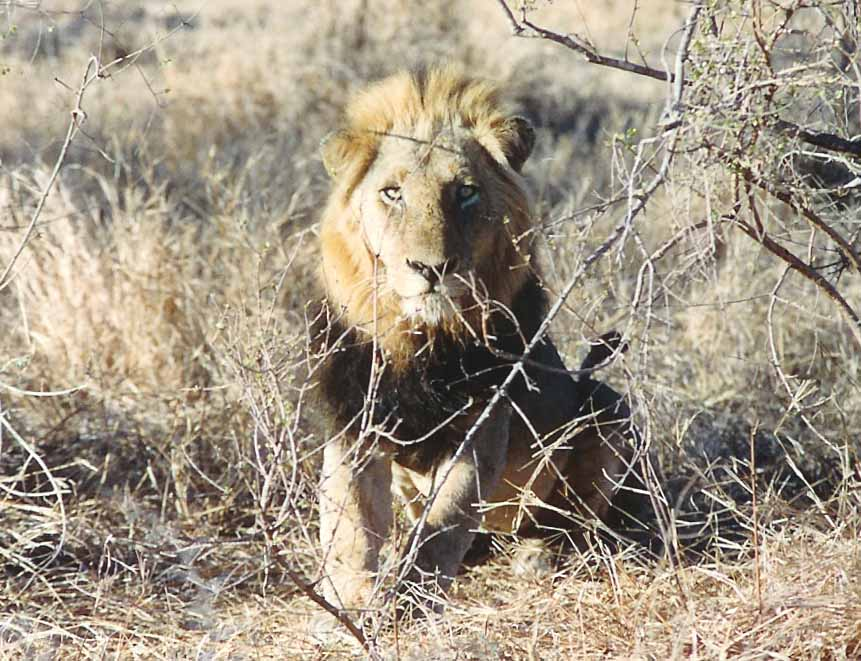
Lion

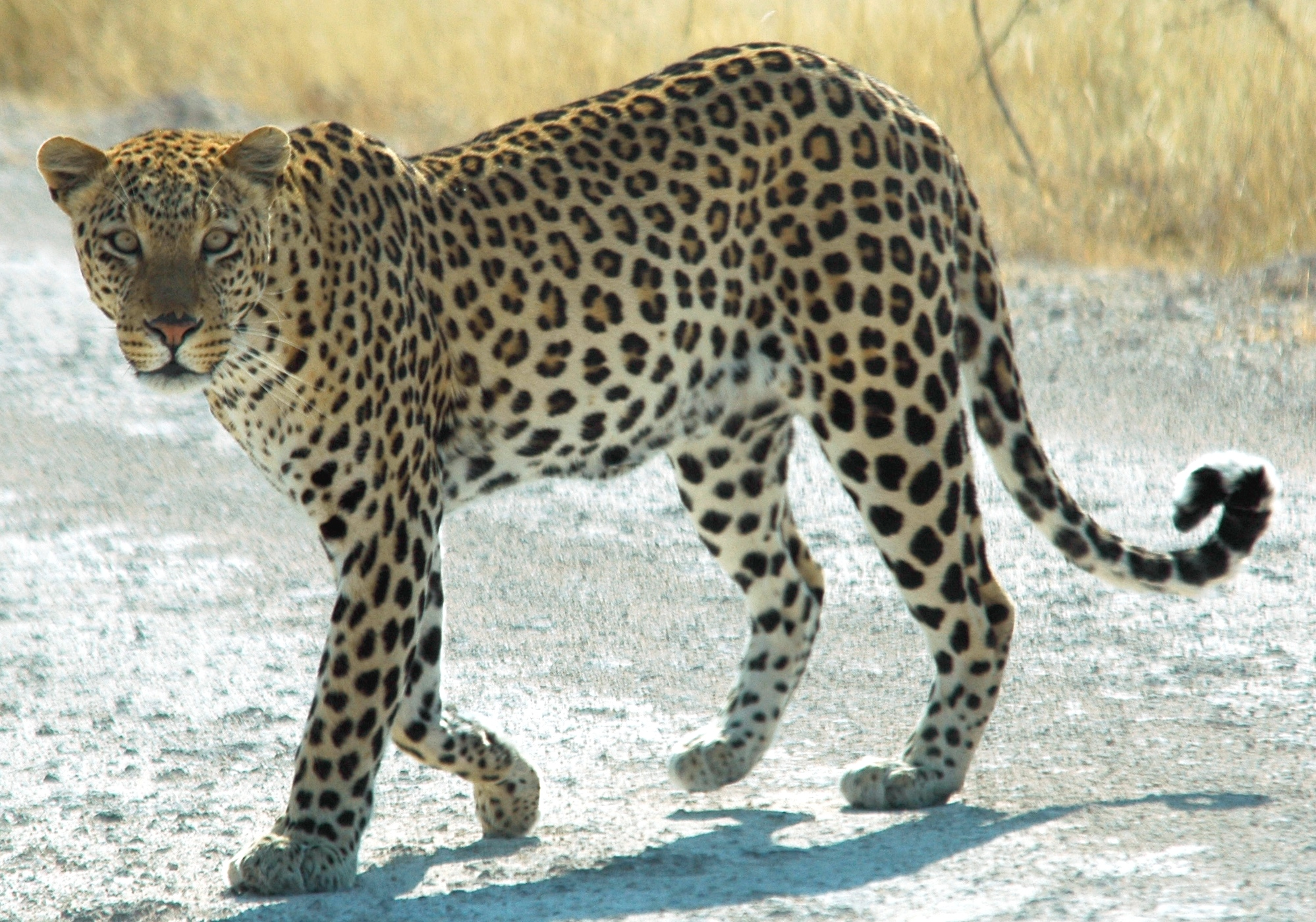
African leopard

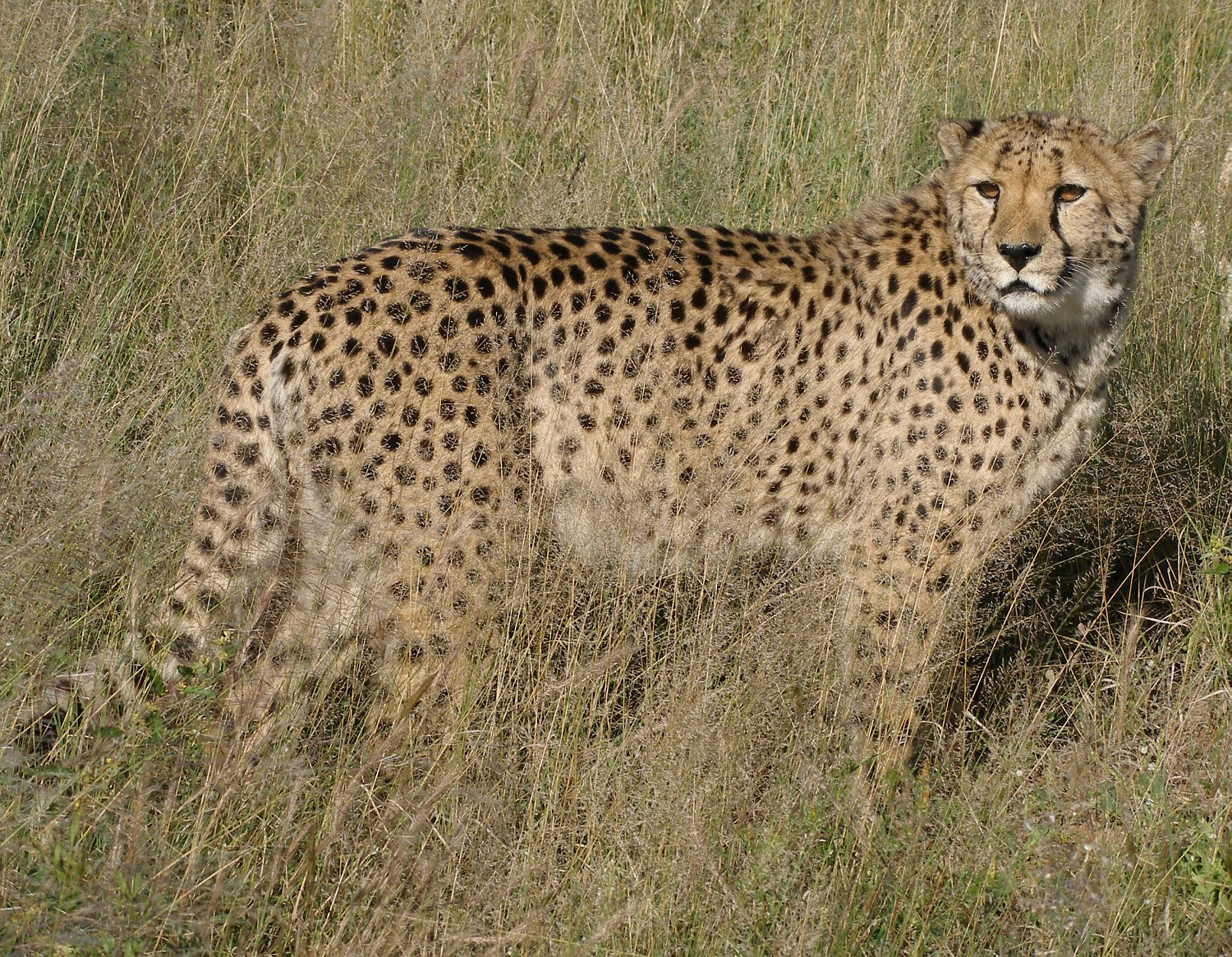
South African cheetah

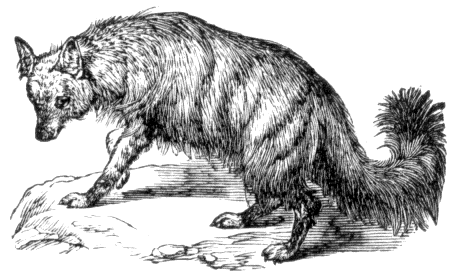
Aardwolf

There are over 260 species of carnivorans, the majority of which feed primarily on meat. They have a characteristic skull shape and dentition.

- Suborder: Feliformia
  - Family: Felidae (cats)
    - Subfamily: Felinae
      - Genus: Acinonyx
        - Cheetah, A. jubatus VU
      - Genus: Caracal
        - Caracal, C. caracal LC
      - Genus: Felis
        - African wildcat, F. lybica LC
      - Genus: Leptailurus
        - Serval, L. serval LC
    - Subfamily: Pantherinae
      - Genus: Panthera
        - Lion, P. leo VU
        - Leopard, P. pardus VU
  - Family: Hyaenidae (hyaenas)
    - Genus: Parahyaena
      - Brown hyena, P. brunnea NT presence uncertain
    - Genus: Proteles
      - Aardwolf, P. cristata LC
- Suborder: Caniformia
  - Family: Canidae (dogs, foxes)
    - Genus: Lupulella
      - Side-striped jackal, L. adusta LC
      - Black-backed jackal, L. mesomelas LC
    - Genus: Lycaon
      - African wild dog, L. pictus EN extirpated
  - Family: Mustelidae (mustelids)
    - Genus: Ictonyx
      - Striped polecat, I. striatus LC
    - Genus: Mellivora
      - Honey badger, M. capensis LC
    - Genus: Aonyx
      - African clawless otter, A. capensis NT

== Order: Perissodactyla (odd-toed ungulates) ==
The odd-toed ungulates are browsing and grazing mammals. They are usually large to very large, and have relatively simple stomachs and a large middle toe.

- Family: Equidae (horses etc.)
  - Genus: Equus
    - Plains zebra, E. quagga NT
      - Burchell's zebra, E. q. burchellii
      - Selous' zebra, E. q. selousi
- Family: Rhinocerotidae
  - Genus: Diceros
    - Black rhinoceros, D. bicornis
      - South-central black rhinoceros, D. b. minor CR reintroduced
  - Genus: Ceratotherium
    - White rhinoceros, c. simum
      - Southern white rhinoceros, C. s. simum NT

== Order: Artiodactyla (even-toed ungulates) ==
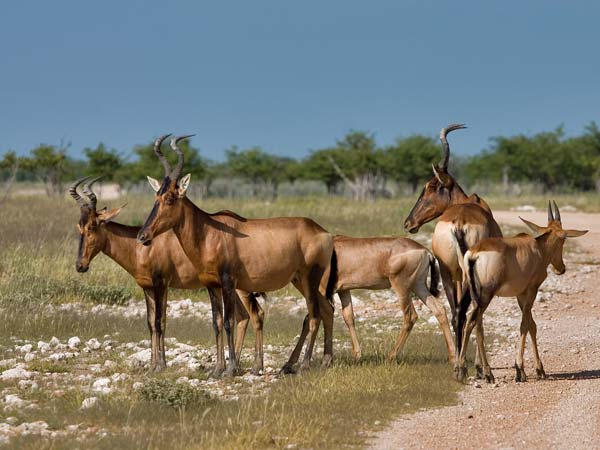
Hartebeest

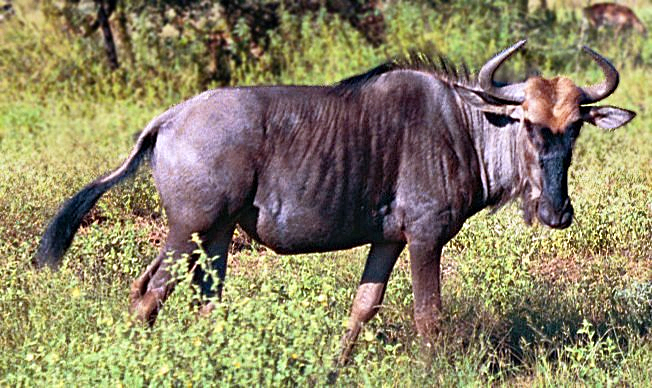
Blue wildebeest

]

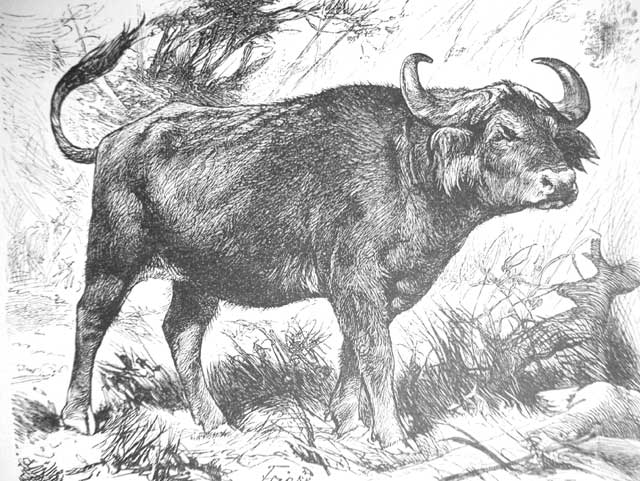
African buffalo

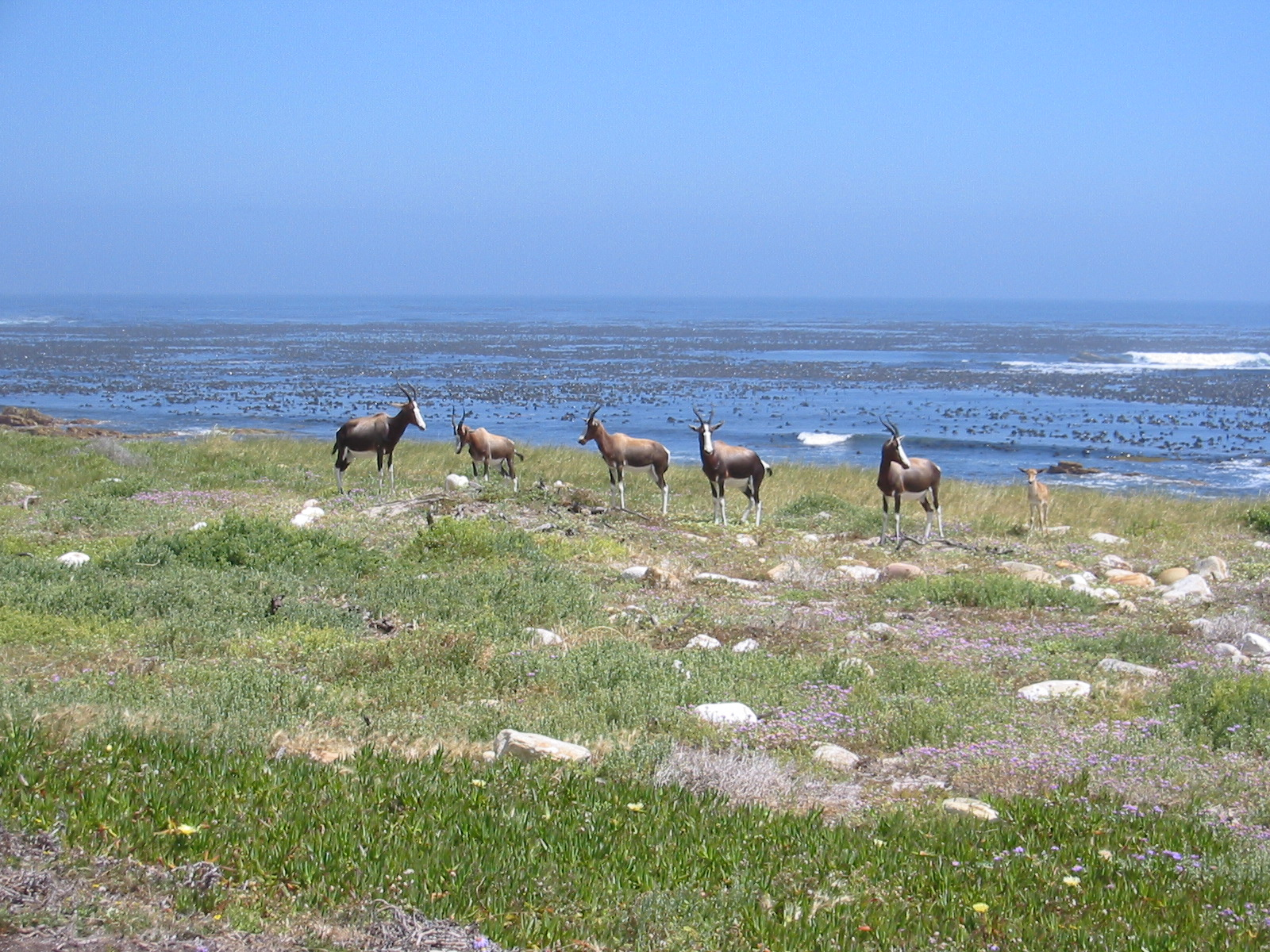
Bontebok

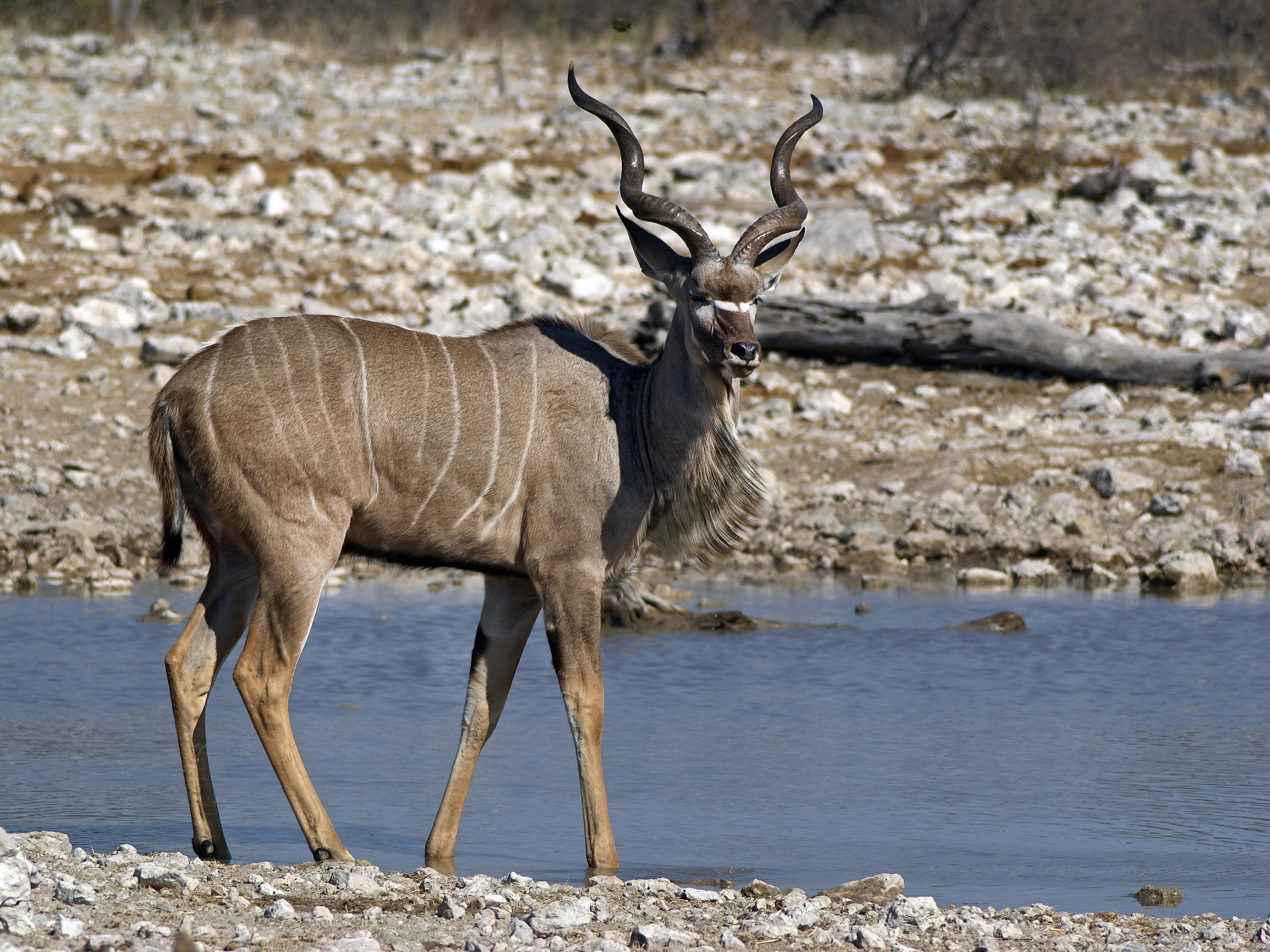
Greater kudu

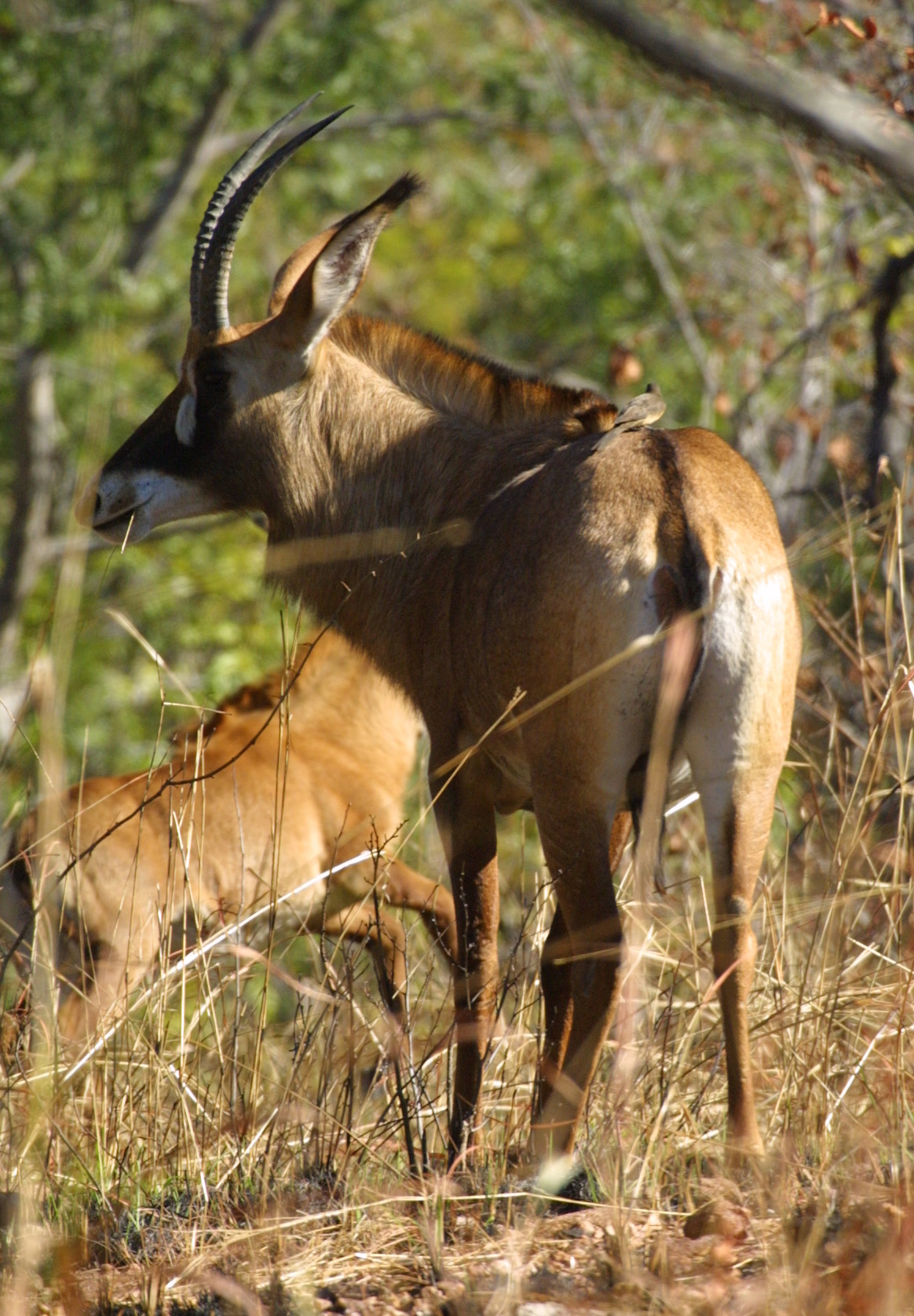
Roan antelope

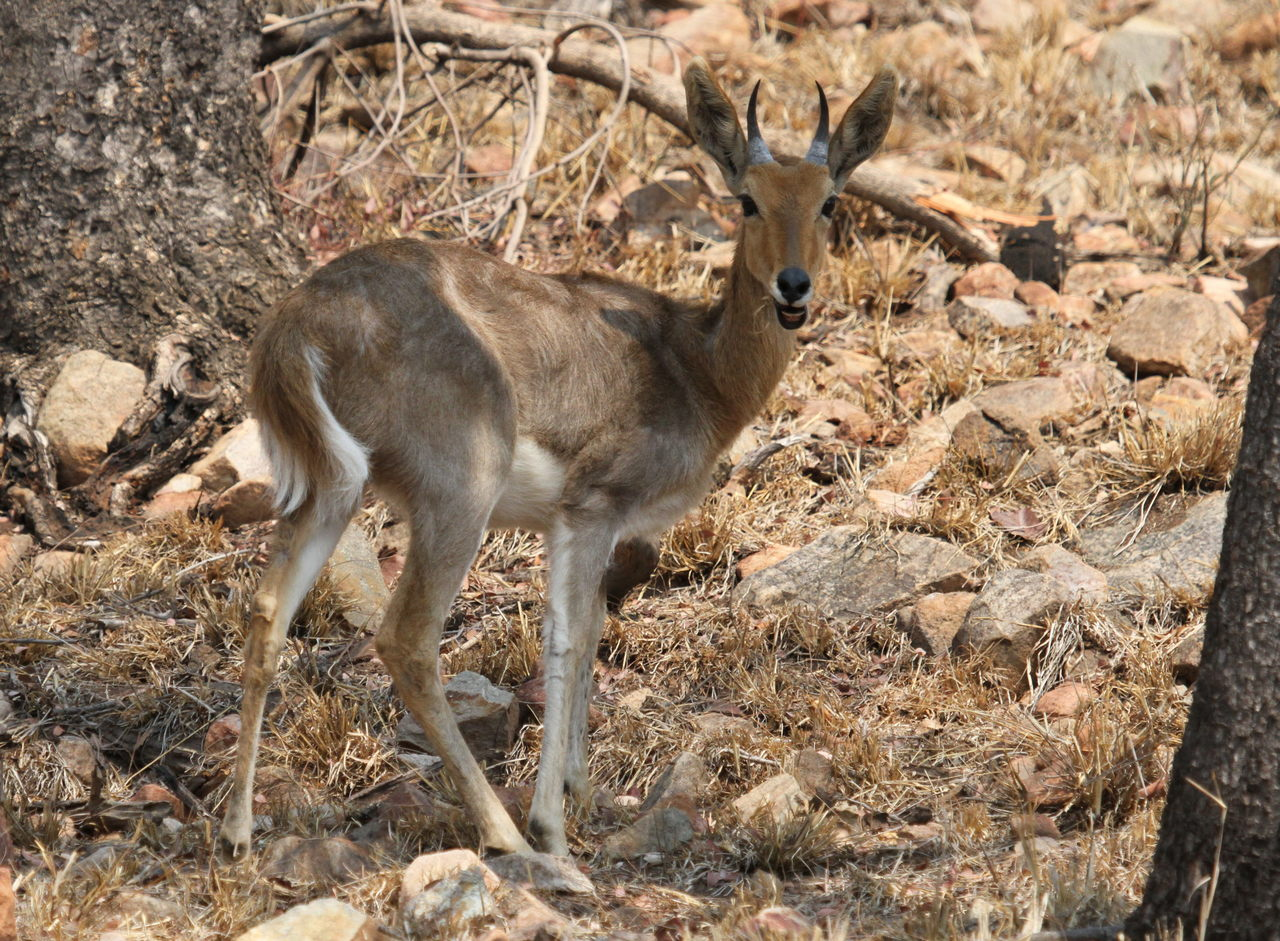
Mountain reedbuck

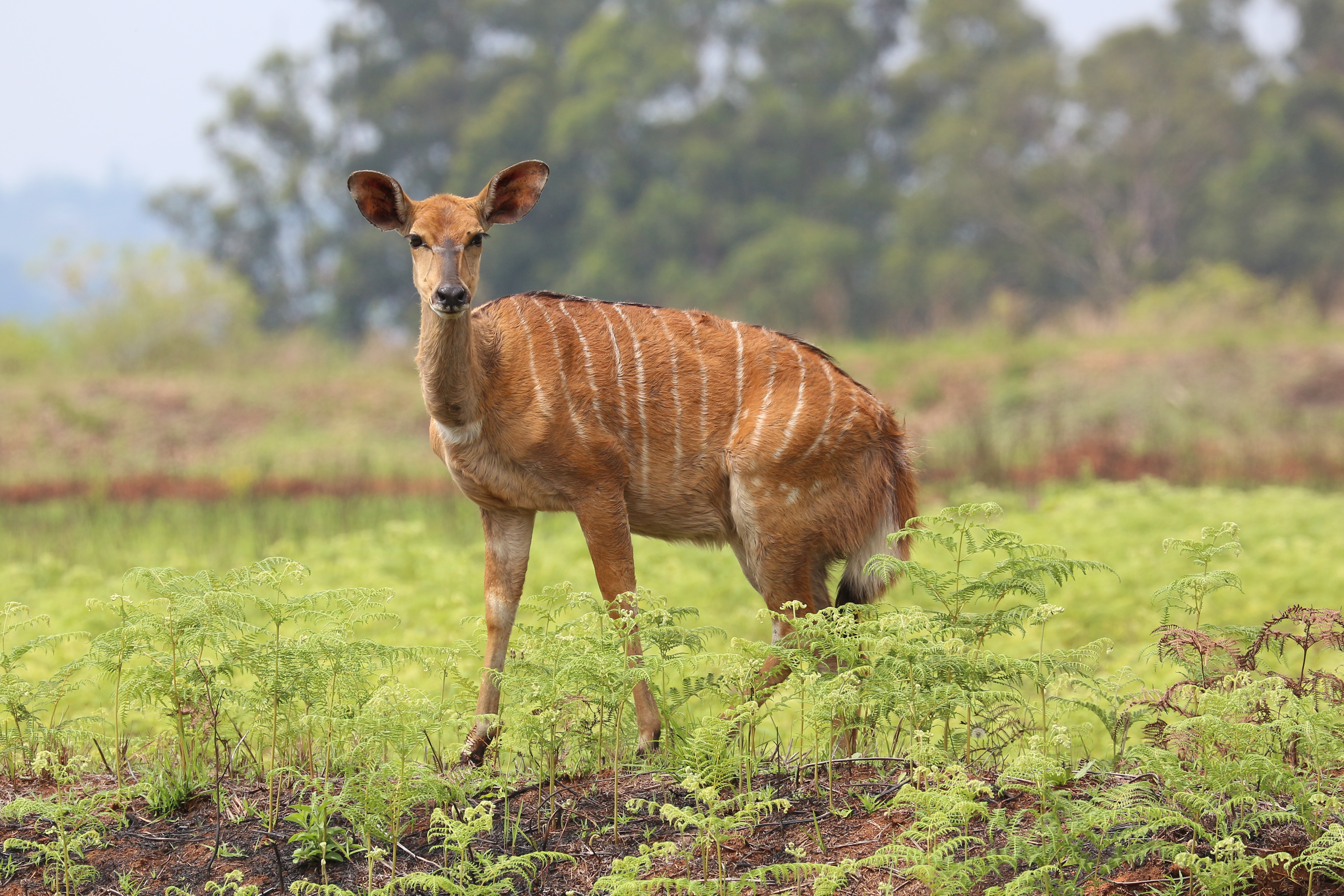
Nyala

The even-toed ungulates are ungulates whose weight is borne about equally by the third and fourth toes, rather than mostly or entirely by the third as in perissodactyls. There are about 220 artiodactyl species, including many that are of great economic importance to humans.

- Family: Suidae (pigs)
  - Subfamily: Phacochoerinae
    - Genus: Phacochoerus
      - Common warthog, Phacochoerus africanus
  - Subfamily: Suinae
    - Genus: Potamochoerus
      - Bushpig, Potamochoerus larvatus
- Family: Hippopotamidae (hippopotamuses)
  - Genus: Hippopotamus
    - Hippopotamus, Hippopotamus amphibius VU
- Family: Giraffidae (giraffe, okapi)
  - Genus: Giraffa
    - Giraffe, Giraffa camelopardalis VU introduced
- Family: Bovidae (cattle, antelope, sheep, goats)
  - Subfamily: Alcelaphinae
    - Genus: Alcelaphus
      - Hartebeest, Alcelaphus buselaphus LC introduced
    - Genus: Connochaetes
      - Black wildebeest, Connochaetes gnou LC
      - Blue wildebeest, Connochaetes taurinus
    - Genus: Damaliscus
      - Topi, Damaliscus lunatus
      - Bontebok, Damaliscus pygargus
  - Subfamily: Antilopinae
    - Genus: Oreotragus
      - Klipspringer, Oreotragus oreotragus
    - Genus: Ourebia
      - Oribi, Ourebia ourebi
    - Genus: Raphicerus
      - Steenbok, Raphicerus campestris
      - Sharpe's grysbok, Raphicerus sharpei
  - Subfamily: Bovinae
    - Genus: Syncerus
      - African buffalo, S. caffer NT reintroduced
    - Genus: Tragelaphus
      - Nyala, Tragelaphus angasii reintroduced
      - Common eland, Tragelaphus oryx
      - Bushbuck, Tragelaphus scriptus
      - Greater kudu, Tragelaphus strepsiceros
  - Subfamily: Cephalophinae
    - Genus: Cephalophus
      - Blue duiker, Cephalophus monticola
      - Red forest duiker, Cephalophus natalensis
    - Genus: Sylvicapra
      - Common duiker, Sylvicapra grimmia
  - Subfamily: Hippotraginae
    - Genus: Hippotragus
      - Roan antelope, Hippotragus equinusLC reintroduced
      - Sable antelope, Hippotragus niger LC introduced
  - Subfamily: Peleinae
    - Genus: Pelea
      - Grey rhebok, Pelea capreolus LC
  - Subfamily: Aepycerotinae
    - Genus: Aepyceros
      - Impala, Aepyceros melampus
  - Subfamily: Reduncinae
    - Genus: Kobus
      - Waterbuck, Kobus ellipsiprymnus
    - Genus: Redunca
      - Southern reedbuck, Redunca arundinum
      - Mountain reedbuck, Redunca fulvorufula LC

== See also ==
- List of chordate orders
- Lists of mammals by region
- List of prehistoric mammals
- Mammal classification
- List of mammals described in the 2000s
