= List of soricids =

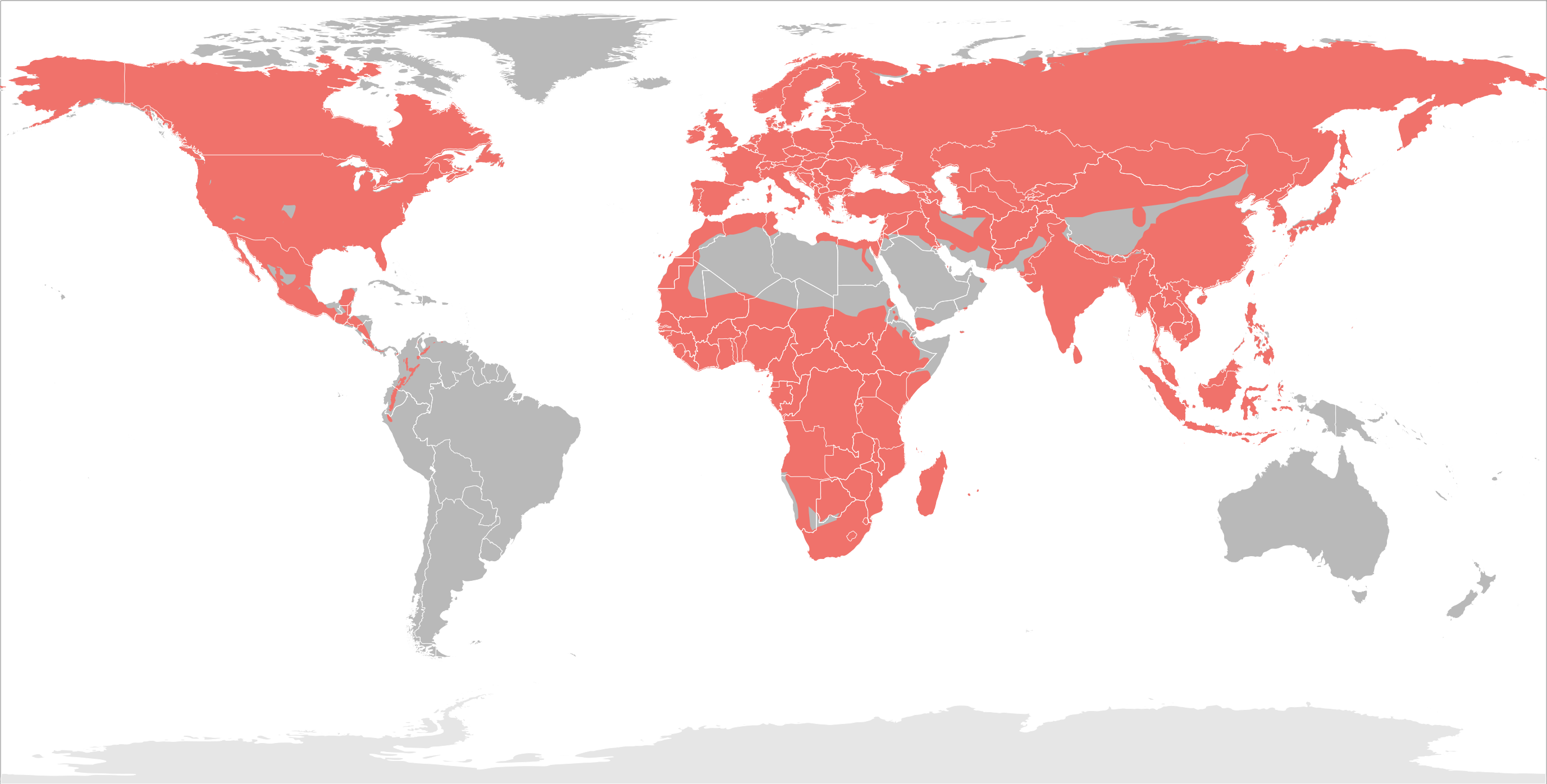
Soricidae distribution

Shrews (family Soricidae) are small mole-like mammals classified in the order Eulipotyphla. True shrews are not to be confused with treeshrews, otter shrews, elephant shrews, West Indies shrews, or marsupial shrews, which belong to different families or orders.

Soricidae is divided into three subfamilies:

- For shrews in the subfamily Crocidurinae (white-toothed shrews), see list of crocidurines
- For shrews in the subfamily Myosoricinae (African shrews), see list of myosoricines
- For shrews in the subfamily Soricinae (red-toothed shrews), see list of soricines

For a list of all animals in the order Eulipotyphla, the majority of which are shrews, see list of eulipotyphlans
