= Notiosorex dalquesti =

Notiosorex dalquesti Temporal range: Pleistocene - Holocene

Scientific classification
- Domain: Eukaryota
- Kingdom: Animalia
- Phylum: Chordata
- Class: Mammalia
- Order: Eulipotyphla
- Family: Soricidae
- Genus: Notiosorex
- Species: †N. dalquesti

Binomial name
- †Notiosorex dalquesti Carroway, 2010

Extinct species of shrew

Notiosorex dalquesti, or Dalquest's shrew, is an extinct species of shrew that was found in the southwestern United States and northern Mexico during the Pleistocene and possibly the Holocene.

Fossils of Dalquest's shrew were once thought to belong to the living Crawford's gray shrew but have since been classified as a distinct species.
