= Rumpi mouse shrew =

Conservation status
- Endangered (IUCN 3.1)]

Scientific classification
- Kingdom: Animalia
- Phylum: Chordata
- Class: Mammalia
- Order: Eulipotyphla
- Family: Soricidae
- Genus: Myosorex
- Species: M. rumpii

Binomial name
- Myosorex rumpii Heim de Balsac, 1968
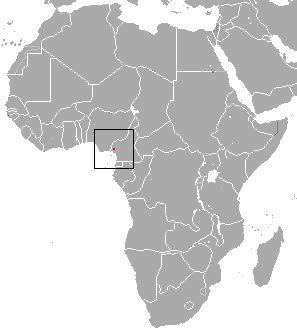
- Rumpi mouse shrew range

Species of mammal

The Rumpi mouse shrew (Myosorex rumpii) is a Myosoricinae shrew only known from the Rumpi Hills, Cameroon. The only known specimen is the holotype, collected around 1967. First described by Heim de Balsac in 1968, it was considered a subspecies of Myosorex eisentrauti. A reanalysis by Hutterer in 2005 elevated it to a full species.

The rumpi mouse shrew is a medium-sized shrew with dark fur and a short tail. It is listed as an endangered species due to habitat loss and a restricted range.
