= Villa's gray shrew =

Conservation status
- Vulnerable (IUCN 3.1)

Scientific classification
- Kingdom: Animalia
- Phylum: Chordata
- Class: Mammalia
- Order: Eulipotyphla
- Family: Soricidae
- Genus: Notiosorex
- Species: N. villa

Binomial name
- Notiosorex villa Carraway and Timm, 2000
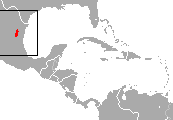
- Villa's gray shrew range

Species of mammal

Villa's gray shrew (Notiosorex villai) is a shrew native to northeastern Mexico, where it is called musaraña.

It is assessed vulnerable by the IUCN due to its small extent of occurrence and degradation of habitat.

== Taxonomy ==
The shrew was formerly considered to be a part of N. crawfordi, but is now considered a distinct species.

== Distribution and habitat ==
Currently it is known to occur in only three locations in two isolated mountain valleys. It is known to inhabit pine-oak forest, tropical forest and riparian forest. The species may have a larger extent of occurrence than is currently known.

== Conservation ==
The species has been assessed as vulnerable by the IUCN Red List. Threats to the species include its small extent of habitats, habitat degradation, overgrazing, and agricultural activities.

The species probably inhabits the western part of the El Cielo Biosphere Reserve in the Mexican state of Tamaulipas.
