= Nagaland shrew =

Scientific classification
- Kingdom: Animalia
- Phylum: Chordata
- Class: Mammalia
- Order: Eulipotyphla
- Family: Soricidae
- Genus: Nagasorex; Hutterer et al., 2025
- Species: N. albidens

Binomial name
- Nagasorex albidens Hutterer, Swanson, Esselstyn & Heaney, 2025

Species of mammal

The Nagaland shrew (Nagasorex albidens) is a species of shrew in the family Soricidae. It is the only species within the monotypic genus Nagasorex. It is endemic to northeastern India. The species was described based on a single specimen obtained in the Naga Hills of Nagaland in 1950. It was formally described as a new genus and species in June 2025. The species describers regarded it as highly divergent from other living shrews, with genetic data suggesting it to be the sister group of the Crocidurinae or the clade comprising Crodicurinae and the African Myosoricinae, with the authors suggesting based on morphological that it was closely related to the extinct Miocene and Pliocene Eurasian genera Dobenflorinia Clapasorex, Miosorex, Crocidosorex, and more distantly to living Myosoricinae. The authors, despite the genetic data not supporting it, tentatively suggested that it should be placed in Myosoricinae.
