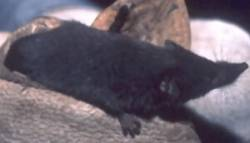
- Crawford's gray shrew (Notiosorex crawfordi)

Scientific classification
- Domain: Eukaryota
- Kingdom: Animalia
- Phylum: Chordata
- Class: Mammalia
- Order: Eulipotyphla
- Family: Soricidae
- Subfamily: Soricinae
- Tribe: Notiosoricini
- Genus: Notiosorex

Type species
- Sorex (Notiosorex) crawfordi Coues, 1877

Species
- N. cockrumi; N. crawfordi; N. evotis; N. villai; N. tataticuli

= Notiosorex =

Notiosorex Temporal range: Late Miocene to Recent, 6.69–Present Ma

Genus of mammals

Notiosorex is a genus of shrew from the subfamily Soricinae.

== History ==
Notiosorex shrews have a fossil history that extends to the Miocene (i.e., mid-Hemphillian). The geographic distribution of the genus has always been in the southwestern United States and northern Mexico.

== Species ==
There are four described extant species of Notiosorex:

- Cockrum's gray shrew (N. cockrumi)
- Crawford's gray shrew (N. crawfordi)
- Large-eared gray shrew (N. evotis)
- Villa's gray shrew (N. villai)

There are several extinct species of Notiosorex described from the fossil record:

- †N. dalquesti
- †N. harrisi
- †N. jacksoni
- †N. repenningi
