= Kihaule's mouse shrew =

Conservation status
- Endangered (IUCN 3.1)

Scientific classification
- Kingdom: Animalia
- Phylum: Chordata
- Class: Mammalia
- Order: Eulipotyphla
- Family: Soricidae
- Genus: Myosorex
- Species: M. kihaulei

Binomial name
- Myosorex kihaulei Stanley & Hutterer, 2000
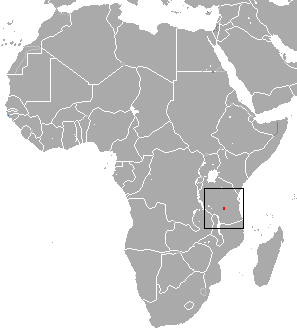
- Kihaule's mouse shrew range

Species of mammal

Kihaule's mouse shrew (Myosorex kihaulei) is a species of mammal in the family Soricidae endemic to Tanzania where it is known only from the Udzungwa Mountains, at the western end of the Eastern Arc Mountains. Its natural habitats are subtropical or tropical moist montane forests and plantations. It is threatened by habitat destruction and the International Union for Conservation of Nature has assessed its conservation status as being "endangered". It was named after Philip M. Kihaule, a medical-entomological technician, who considerably contributed to the documenting of the small mammals of Tanzania and collected the type specimen of this shrew.

== Description ==
Kihaule's mouse shrew has a head-and-body length of between 70 and 84 mm (2.8 and 3.3 in) and a tail length of between 36 and 46 mm (1.4 and 1.8 in). The dorsal fur is dark brown, the individual hairs having brownish-black bases and paler brown tips. The ventral fur is brown, but not such a rich shade as that of the Geata mouse shrew (Myosorex geata), which it otherwise resembles. The tubercles on the hind feet are large and rounded, and the claws are sturdy. The tail is about half the length of the combined head-and-body.

== Distribution and habitat ==
This shrew is endemic to Tanzania, and is only known from the Udzungwa Mountains, one of the ranges of the Eastern Arc Mountains, although some specimens of a species of Myosorex on Mount Rungwe might prove to be M. kihaulei. At one time these mountains were part of a continuous belt of rainforest, but climate changes resulted in the lowland areas between the mountains becoming savannah, and the forest on each mountain range was separated from the neighbouring ranges, resulting in much endemism. This shrew is found in moist montane forest, including swamp forest and areas of bamboo, at altitudes of over 1,400 m (4,600 ft).

== Status ==
Kihaule's mouse shrew is estimated to have a total area of occupation of 1,616 km^{2} (624 mi^{2}). This shrew is a common species in suitable habitats within its range, but it is threatened by deforestation as land is cleared for agricultural production. It is unclear whether it is able to adapt to live in degraded habitats such as secondary forest, although one individual was found in a tea plantation. Because of these factors, the International Union for Conservation of Nature has assessed its conservation status as being "endangered".
