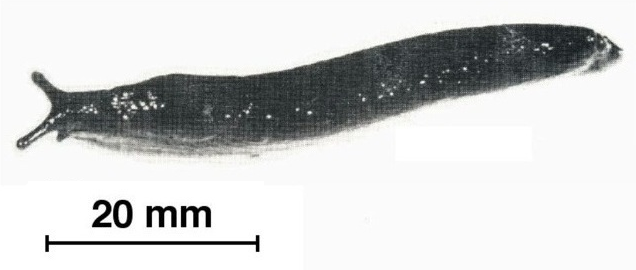
- Ariostralis nebulosa

Scientific classification
- Kingdom: Animalia
- Phylum: Mollusca
- Class: Gastropoda
- Order: Stylommatophora
- Superfamily: Punctoidea
- Family: Oopeltidae; Cockerell, 1891

= Oopeltidae =

Family of molluscs

Oopeltidae is a family of air-breathing land slugs, terrestrial pulmonate gastropod mollusks in the superfamily Arionoidea (according to the taxonomy of the Gastropoda by Bouchet & Rocroi, 2005).

== Subfamilies and genera ==
The family Oopeltidae consists of two subfamilies:

- Oopeltinae Cockerell, 1891
- Ariopeltinae Sirgel, 1985

Genera in the family Oopeltidae include:

Oopeltinae

- Oopelta Mörch [in Heynemann], 1867 - type genus of the family Oopeltidae
  - Oopelta nigropunctata

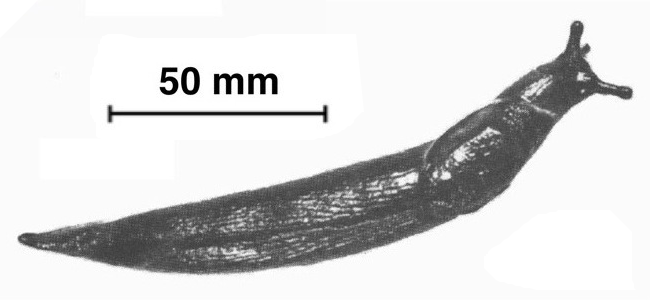
Ariopelta capensis

Ariopeltinae

- Ariopelta Sirgel, 1985 - type genus of the subfamily Ariopeltinae
  - Ariopelta capensis Krauss, 1848 - type species, synonym: Limax (Limas) capensis Krauss, 1848
  - Ariopelta variegata Sirgel, 2012
- Ariostralis
  - Ariostralis nebulosa

== Distribution ==
Two genera of Ariopeltinae live in South Africa. Ariopelta capensis and Ariostralis nebulosa are relict primitive species in the Cape Fold Mountains. In the Landdroskop area there are melanistic populations of these slugs.
