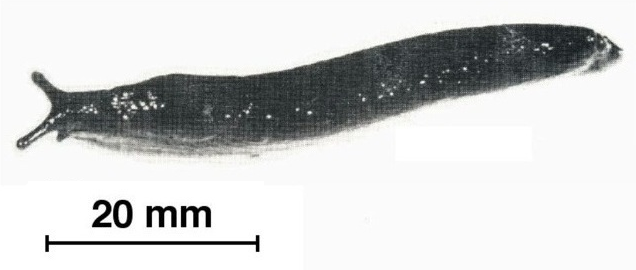
- Black-and-white photo of a live individual of A. nebulosa

Scientific classification
- Kingdom: Animalia
- Phylum: Mollusca
- Class: Gastropoda
- Order: Stylommatophora
- Family: Oopeltidae
- Subfamily: Ariopeltinae
- Genus: Ariostralis; Sirgel, 1985
- Species: A. nebulosa

Binomial name
- Ariostralis nebulosa Sirgel, 1985

= Ariostralis =

Genus of gastropods

Ariostralis nebulosa is a species of air-breathing land slug, a terrestrial, pulmonate, gastropod mollusc in the family Oopeltidae.

== Distribution ==
This is a species of non-marine mollusc found in South Africa only.

== Ecology ==
Ariostralis nebulosa is readily found throughout the year.

Ariostralis nebulosa serves as the first intermediate host for a parasite, the brachylaimid trematode Renylaima capensis. Branched, cercariogenous sporocysts of this parasite massively develop in A. nebulosa. These sporocysts are attached to the hepatopancreas, body wall, pallial floor and even to the genital system. This fluke is highly specific at the first intermediate host level.

The forest shrew (Myosorex varius) is a predator of A. nebulosa. There is a possible direct infection of the shrew by the cercariae of R. capensis.
