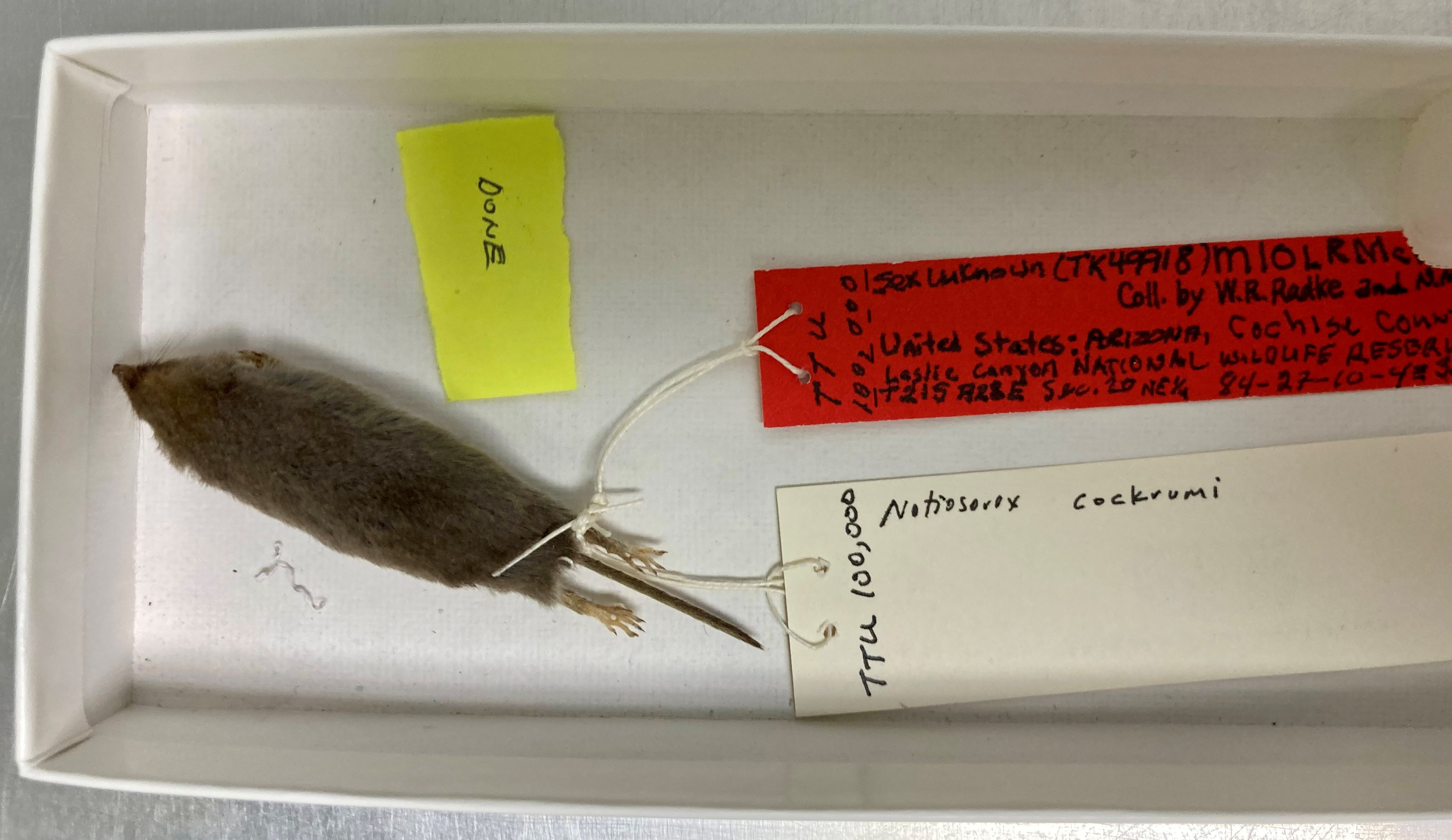
- Specimen of Notiosorex cockrumi in the Natural Science Research Laboratory's (NSRL) collection at the Museum of Texas Tech University

Conservation status
- Least Concern (IUCN 3.1)

- Imperiled (NatureServe)

Scientific classification
- Kingdom: Animalia
- Phylum: Chordata
- Class: Mammalia
- Order: Eulipotyphla
- Family: Soricidae
- Genus: Notiosorex
- Species: N. cockrumi

Binomial name
- Notiosorex cockrumi Baker, O'Neill & McAliley, 2003
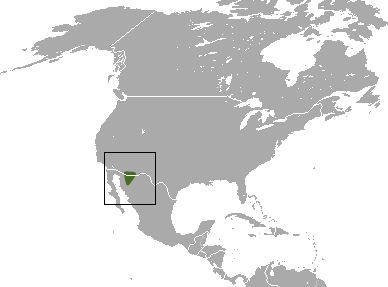
- Cockrum's gray shrew range

= Notiosorex cockrumi =

Cockrum's gray shrew

Species of mammal

Notiosorex cockrumi, also called Cockrum's gray shrew or Cockrum's desert shrew, is a tiny species of shrew that was named in 2003. This red-toothed shrew, which is as light as a penny, is the first new mammal species to be discovered in the U.S. state of Arizona since 1977. Its range extends from Arizona to the central portion of the Mexican state of Sonora.

== Distribution and habitat ==
The shrew is found in desert habitats from southeastern and south-central Arizona to central Sonora. It typically inhabits desert shrub, and plant communities dominated by mesquite, agave, cholla, and oakbrush. It burrows in the soil or in fallen logs and debris.

== Characteristics ==
The shrew is very small and is insectivorous. It has a brown-gray color with a reddish-pink nose, tail and feet. Its nose has large whiskers and it also possesses large ears.
