= Large-eared gray shrew =

Large-eared Gray Shrew

Scientific classification
- Domain: Eukaryota
- Kingdom: Animalia
- Phylum: Chordata
- Class: Mammalia
- Order: Eulipotyphla
- Family: Soricidae
- Genus: Notiosorex
- Species: N. evotis

Binomial name
- Notiosorex evotis (Coues, 1877)
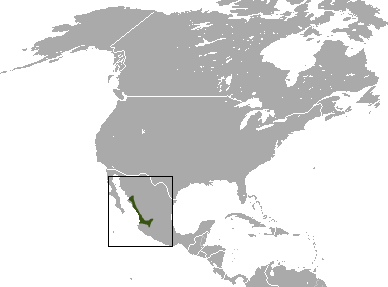
- Large-eared gray shrew range

Species of mammal

The large-eared gray shrew (Notiosorex evotis) is a species of shrew.
