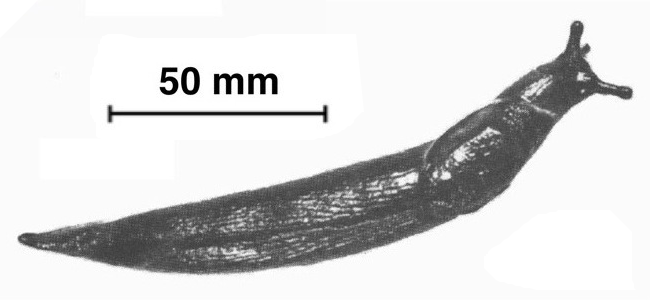
- Black-and-white photo of a live individual of Ariopelta capensis

Scientific classification
- Kingdom: Animalia
- Phylum: Mollusca
- Class: Gastropoda
- Order: Stylommatophora
- Family: Oopeltidae
- Genus: Ariopelta
- Species: A. capensis

Binomial name
- Ariopelta capensis (Krauss, 1848)

Synonyms
- Limax (Limas) capensis Krauss, 1848

= Ariopelta capensis =

Species of gastropod

Ariopelta capensis is a species of air-breathing land slug, a terrestrial, pulmonate, gastropod mollusc in the family Oopeltidae.

Ariopelta capensis is the type species of the genus Ariopelta.

== Distribution ==
Distribution of Ariopelta capensis includes South Africa.

== Ecology ==
Ariopelta capensis serves as the second intermediate host for a parasite, the brachylaimid trematode Renylaima capensis. Unencysted metacercariae, usually brevicaudate, infect the kidney of Ariopelta capensis and differ from mature cercariae by only a slightly greater size.
