= Kabogo mouse shrew =

Conservation status
- Data Deficient (IUCN 3.1)

Scientific classification
- Kingdom: Animalia
- Phylum: Chordata
- Class: Mammalia
- Order: Eulipotyphla
- Family: Soricidae
- Genus: Myosorex
- Species: M. kabogoensis

Binomial name
- Myosorex kabogoensis (Kerbis Peterhans & Hutterer, 2013)

Species of mammal

The Kabogo mouse shrew (Myosorex kabogoensis) is a species of mammal in the family Soricidae endemic to Democratic Republic of Congo. Its natural habitat is forests and inland wetlands. It eats insects, as well as small birds and mammals.
