= Oku mouse shrew =

Conservation status
- Vulnerable (IUCN 3.1)

Scientific classification
- Kingdom: Animalia
- Phylum: Chordata
- Class: Mammalia
- Order: Eulipotyphla
- Family: Soricidae
- Genus: Myosorex
- Species: M. okuensis

Binomial name
- Myosorex okuensis Heim de Balsac, 1968
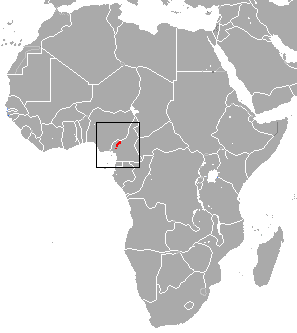
- Oku mouse shrew range

Species of mammal

The Oku mouse shrew (Myosorex okuensis) is a species of mammal in the family Soricidae endemic to Cameroon. Its natural habitat is subtropical or tropical moist montane forests.
