= Thin mouse shrew =

Conservation status
- Endangered (IUCN 3.1)

Scientific classification
- Kingdom: Animalia
- Phylum: Chordata
- Class: Mammalia
- Order: Eulipotyphla
- Family: Soricidae
- Genus: Myosorex
- Species: M. tenuis

Binomial name
- Myosorex tenuis Thomas & Schwann, 1905
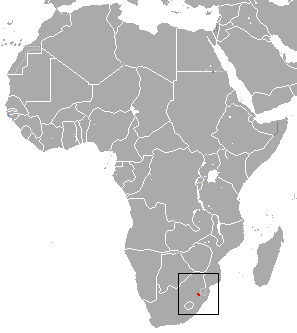
- Thin mouse shrew range

Species of mammal

The thin mouse shrew (Myosorex tenuis) is a species of mammal in the family Soricidae found in South Africa.

== Taxonomy ==
Myosorex tenuis was first described by Thomas and Schwann in 1905, and was often considered a synonym or subspecies of M. cafer. It is not accepted by all taxonomic analyses, partly due to a lack of accessible definitively identified specimens. Taylor et al., in a 2013 paper, provisionally identified a newly described species of Myosorex with the previously described species M. tenuis, but the identification is uncertain. Their identification was based primarily on genetic data.

== Description ==
Myosorex tenuis is a medium-sized shrew with dark fur.

It is sometimes distinguished from other species of the genus by a smaller skull size, but species in this genus are typically difficult to morphologically identify due to significant intra-species variation. It is primarily separated from the similar M. cafer by genetic differences and habitat, and is estimated by Taylor et al to have diverged from its nearest genetic relative, M. varius, approximately 2.7 million years ago. A 2023 climatic niche modelling study proposes that the divergence from M. varius was due to habitat contraction during a interglacial cycle; the divergence roughly coincided with the start of the Pleistocene glacial cycles.

The species habitat is Afromontane grassland, and they are more common at higher elevations. Specimens have primarily been collected from wetlands and moist grassland. The species was originally identified in Wakkerstroom District, Mpumalanga Province, South Africa, while the species identified by Taylor et al provisionally identified with M. tenuis is found in Limpopo Province, South Africa. The species range may reach Eswatini and Mozambique. Due to its limited range and the loss and fragmentation of grassland habitat, the species is considered endangered, though there is no clear estimate of its population numbers. Modelling by Taylor et al. estimates a 35–41% decrease in their habitat from 1975 to 2050; threats include mining, overgrazing, and expansion of human settlement in the region.
