= Eisentraut's mouse shrew =

Conservation status
- Critically Endangered (IUCN 3.1)

Scientific classification
- Kingdom: Animalia
- Phylum: Chordata
- Class: Mammalia
- Order: Eulipotyphla
- Family: Soricidae
- Genus: Myosorex
- Species: M. eisentrauti

Binomial name
- Myosorex eisentrauti Heim de Balsac, 1968
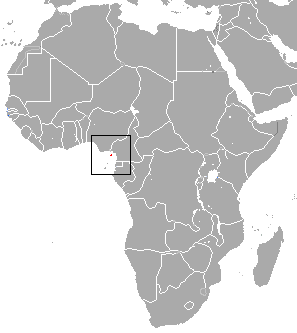
- Eisentraut's mouse shrew range

Species of mammal

Eisentraut's mouse shrew (Myosorex eisentrauti) is a Myosoricinae shrew found only on the island of Bioko, Equatorial Guinea. It is listed as a critically endangered species due to habitat loss and a restricted range.
