= Sclater's mouse shrew =

Conservation status
- Vulnerable (IUCN 3.1)

Scientific classification
- Kingdom: Animalia
- Phylum: Chordata
- Class: Mammalia
- Order: Eulipotyphla
- Family: Soricidae
- Genus: Myosorex
- Species: M. sclateri

Binomial name
- Myosorex sclateri Thomas & Schwann, 1905
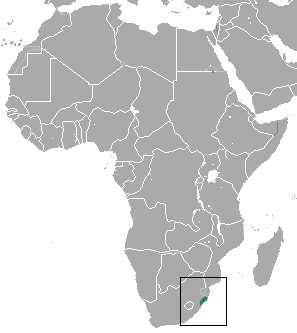
- Sclater's mouse shrew range

Species of mammal

Sclater's mouse shrew (Myosorex sclateri) is a species of mammal in the family Soricidae endemic to South Africa. Its natural habitats are subtropical or tropical moist lowland forests and swamps.
