= Long-tailed forest shrew =

Conservation status
- Endangered (IUCN 3.1)

Scientific classification
- Kingdom: Animalia
- Phylum: Chordata
- Class: Mammalia
- Order: Eulipotyphla
- Family: Soricidae
- Genus: Myosorex
- Species: M. longicaudatus

Binomial name
- Myosorex longicaudatus Meester & Dippenaar, 1978
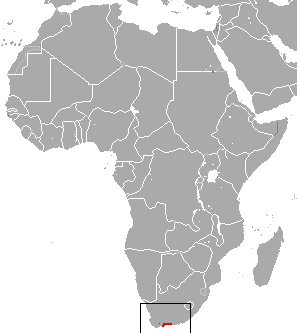
- Long-tailed forest shrew range

Species of mammal

The long-tailed forest shrew, or long-tailed mouse shrew, (Myosorex longicaudatus) is a species of mammal in the family Soricidae. It is endemic to South Africa, where its natural habitats are Mediterranean-type shrubby vegetation and swamps.

== Description ==
The long-tailed forest shrew has a head-and-body length of between 73 and 93 mm (2.9 and 3.7 in), with a tail averaging 66 mm (2.6 in). The dorsal fur is mainly dark grey; the individual hairs have grey bases, yellowish or brownish shafts and blackish tips, creating a yellowish, brownish or blackish washed effect on the coat. The underparts are somewhat paler, with the dorsal and ventral colourings merging on the flanks. The tail is brownish-black above and paler underneath.

== Distribution and habitat ==
This shrew is endemic to South Africa, where it is restricted to a coastal strip in Cape Province. It occurs at altitudes of up to about 2,000 m (6,600 ft), with a subspecies, Myosorex longicaudatus boosmai, occurring in the Langeberg Mountains at higher altitudes than other populations. Suitable habitat includes primary forests and their edges, fynbos and swampy grassland. This shrew needs moist conditions and does not occur in secondary forest.

== Ecology ==
This shrew feeds mainly on insects, but also eats other small invertebrates, and seeds have been found among its stomach contents. When sniffing its surroundings, this shrew stands on its hind legs and braces itself with its tail. It also uses its tail in a prehensile manner when descending from vegetation.

== Status ==
In suitable habitat, this species is quite common. Population sizes seem to vary considerably, in one instance no individuals were found in an area that had been well-populated during the previous survey. The greatest threat facing this shrew is probably climate change; it is dependent on a moist environment and the surrounding terrain is drier than its present habitat. It is also threatened by habitat destruction. The International Union for Conservation of Nature has assessed its conservation status as being endangered.
