= Babault's mouse shrew =

Conservation status
- Least Concern (IUCN 3.1)

Scientific classification
- Kingdom: Animalia
- Phylum: Chordata
- Class: Mammalia
- Order: Eulipotyphla
- Family: Soricidae
- Genus: Myosorex
- Species: M. babaulti

Binomial name
- Myosorex babaulti Heim de Balsac & Lamotte, 1956
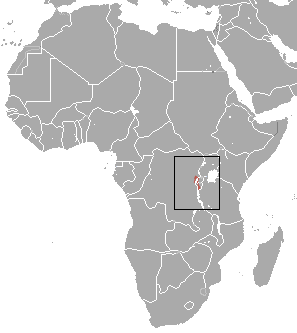
- Babault's mouse shrew range

Species of mammal

Babault's mouse shrew (Myosorex babaulti) is a species of mammal in the family Soricidae found in Burundi, the Democratic Republic of the Congo, and Uganda. Its natural habitat is subtropical or tropical moist montane forests.
