= Kilimanjaro mouse shrew =

Conservation status
- Least Concern (IUCN 3.1)

Scientific classification
- Kingdom: Animalia
- Phylum: Chordata
- Class: Mammalia
- Order: Eulipotyphla
- Family: Soricidae
- Genus: Myosorex
- Species: M. zinki

Binomial name
- Myosorex zinki Heim de Balsac & Lamotte, 1956
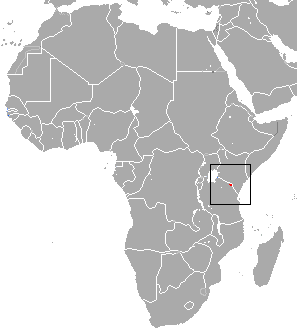
- Kilimanjaro mouse shrew range

Species of mammal

The Kilimanjaro mouse shrew (Myosorex zinki) is a species of mammal in the family Soricidae endemic to Kilimanjaro Region of Tanzania. Its natural habitats are subtropical or tropical moist montane forests and swamps.
