= Congo shrew =

Congo shrews

Scientific classification
- Domain: Eukaryota
- Kingdom: Animalia
- Phylum: Chordata
- Class: Mammalia
- Order: Eulipotyphla
- Family: Soricidae
- Subfamily: Myosoricinae
- Genus: Congosorex; Heim de Balsac and Lamotte, 1956

Type species
- Myosorex polli

Species
- Congosorex phillipsorum Congosorex polli Congosorex verheyeni

Genus of mammals

The Congo shrews, members of the genus Congosorex, are mammals in the family Soricidae. The genus contains these species:

- Phillips's Congo shrew, C. phillipsorum
- Greater Congo shrew, C. polli
- Lesser Congo shrew, C. verheyeni
