= Lesser Congo shrew =

Conservation status
- Least Concern (IUCN 3.1)

Scientific classification
- Kingdom: Animalia
- Phylum: Chordata
- Class: Mammalia
- Order: Eulipotyphla
- Family: Soricidae
- Genus: Congosorex
- Species: C. verheyeni

Binomial name
- Congosorex verheyeni Hutterer, Barriere & Colyn, 2002
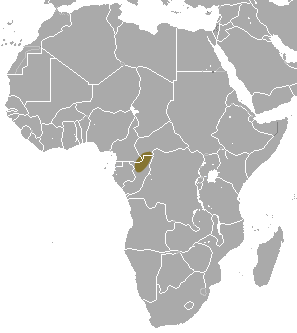
- Lesser Congo Shrew range

Species of mammal

The lesser Congo shrew (Congosorex verheyeni) is a species of mammal in the family Soricidae found in Cameroon, the Central African Republic, the Republic of the Congo, and Gabon. Its natural habitat is subtropical or tropical moist lowland forest.
