= Kahuzi swamp shrew =

Conservation status
- Vulnerable (IUCN 3.1)

Scientific classification
- Kingdom: Animalia
- Phylum: Chordata
- Class: Mammalia
- Order: Eulipotyphla
- Family: Soricidae
- Genus: Myosorex
- Species: M. jejei

Binomial name
- Myosorex jejei Kerbis Peterhans et al. 2010
- Myosorex jejei - Extant (resident)

Species of mammal

The Kahuzi swamp shrew (Myosorex jejei) is a species of mammal in the family Soricidae found in the Democratic Republic of the Congo. Its natural habitat is swampland.
