= Bururi forest shrew =

Conservation status
- Vulnerable (IUCN 3.1)

Scientific classification
- Kingdom: Animalia
- Phylum: Chordata
- Class: Mammalia
- Order: Eulipotyphla
- Family: Soricidae
- Genus: Myosorex
- Species: M. bururiensis

Binomial name
- Myosorex bururiensis Peterhans et al. 2010

Species of mammal

The Bururi forest shrew (Myosorex bururiensis) is a species of mouse shrew native to Burundi. It was first described by Peterhans et al. in 2010, and is defined by a broad hexagonal skull, short tail, and long claws.
