= Nyika burrowing shrew =

Conservation status
- Endangered (IUCN 3.1)

Scientific classification
- Kingdom: Animalia
- Phylum: Chordata
- Class: Mammalia
- Order: Eulipotyphla
- Family: Soricidae
- Genus: Myosorex
- Species: M. gnoskei

Binomial name
- Myosorex gnoskei Kerbis Peterhans, Hutterer, Kaliba & Mazibuko, 2008

Species of mammal

The Nyika burrowing shrew (Myosorex gnoskei) is a species of mammal in the family Soricidae found in Malawi.
