= Mexican shrew =

Conservation status
- Least Concern (IUCN 3.1)

Scientific classification
- Kingdom: Animalia
- Phylum: Chordata
- Class: Mammalia
- Order: Eulipotyphla
- Family: Soricidae
- Genus: Megasorex; Hibbard (1950)
- Species: M. gigas

Binomial name
- Megasorex gigas (Merriam, 1897)
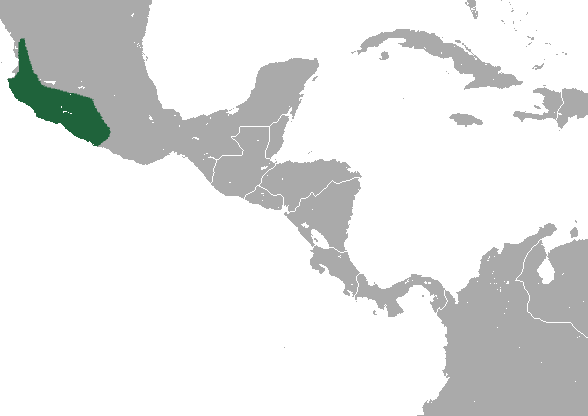
- Mexican shrew range

Species of mammal

The Mexican shrew (Megasorex gigas) is a species of mammal from the subfamily Soricinae in the family Soricidae. It is monotypic within the genus Megasorex and is endemic to Mexico.
