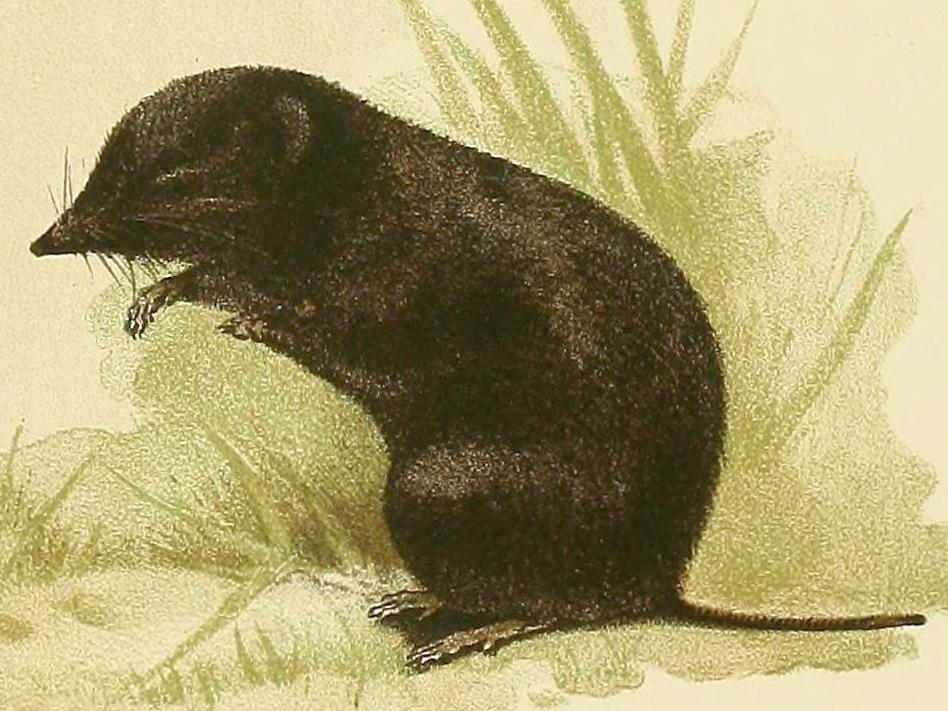

Conservation status
- Endangered (IUCN 3.1)

Scientific classification
- Kingdom: Animalia
- Phylum: Chordata
- Class: Mammalia
- Order: Eulipotyphla
- Family: Soricidae
- Genus: Myosorex
- Species: M. blarina

Binomial name
- Myosorex blarina Thomas, 1906
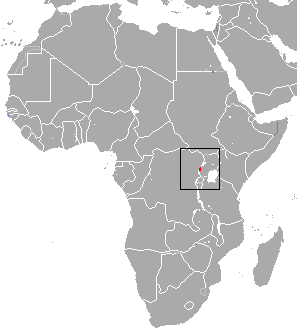
- Montane mouse shrew range

= Montane mouse shrew =

Species of mammal

The montane mouse shrew (Myosorex blarina) is a species of mammal in the family Soricidae endemic to Uganda. Its natural habitats are subtropical or tropical moist montane forests and swamps. It is threatened by habitat loss.
