= Schaller's mouse shrew =

Conservation status
- Data Deficient (IUCN 3.1)

Scientific classification
- Kingdom: Animalia
- Phylum: Chordata
- Class: Mammalia
- Order: Eulipotyphla
- Family: Soricidae
- Genus: Myosorex
- Species: M. schalleri

Binomial name
- Myosorex schalleri Heim de Balsac, 1966
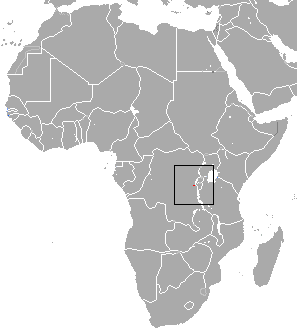
- Schaller's mouse shrew range

Species of mammal

Schaller's mouse shrew (Myosorex schalleri) is a species of mammal in the family Soricidae endemic to the Democratic Republic of Congo. Its natural habitat is subtropical or tropical moist montane forests.
