= Phillips' Congo shrew =

Conservation status
- Critically Endangered (IUCN 3.1)

Scientific classification
- Kingdom: Animalia
- Phylum: Chordata
- Class: Mammalia
- Order: Eulipotyphla
- Family: Soricidae
- Genus: Congosorex
- Species: C. phillipsorum

Binomial name
- Congosorex phillipsorum Stanley, Rogers & Hutterer, 2005

Species of mammal

The Phillips' Congo shrew (Congosorex polli) is a species of mammal in the family Soricidae. It is endemic to Tanzania.
