= Geata mouse shrew =

Conservation status
- Endangered (IUCN 3.1)

Scientific classification
- Kingdom: Animalia
- Phylum: Chordata
- Class: Mammalia
- Order: Eulipotyphla
- Family: Soricidae
- Genus: Myosorex
- Species: M. geata

Binomial name
- Myosorex geata (G. M. Allen & Loveridge, 1927)
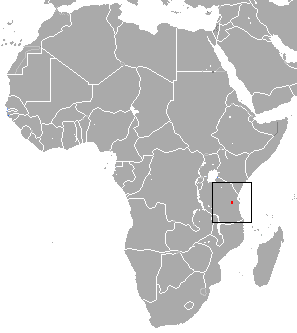
- Geata mouse shrew range

Species of mammal

The Geata mouse shrew (Myosorex geata) is a species of mammal in the family Soricidae endemic to Tanzania. Its natural habitat is subtropical or tropical moist montane forests.
