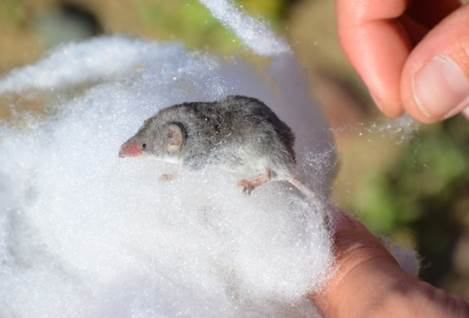

Conservation status
- Least Concern (IUCN 3.1)

- Apparently Secure (NatureServe)

Scientific classification
- Kingdom: Animalia
- Phylum: Chordata
- Class: Mammalia
- Order: Eulipotyphla
- Family: Soricidae
- Genus: Notiosorex
- Species: N. crawfordi

Binomial name
- Notiosorex crawfordi (Coues, 1877)
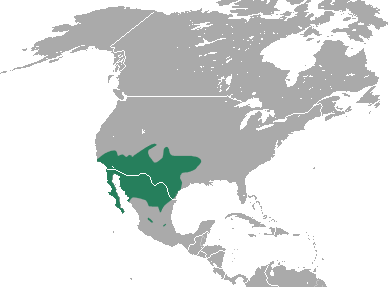
- Crawford's gray shrew range

= Crawford's gray shrew =

Species of mammal

Crawford's gray shrew (Notiosorex crawfordi), also known as the desert shrew, is a small shrew found in the southwestern United States and northern Mexico. It is a member of the family Soricidae of the order Eulipotyphla. It was the only known member of the genus Notiosorex until two species, N. villai distributed in the Mexican state of Tamaulipas, and N. evotis distributed along the northwest coast of Mexico, were named. A fourth distinct species, N. cockrumi, was discovered in the U.S. state of Arizona and named in 2004.

== Description ==
Crawford's gray shrew is one of the smallest desert mammals and one of the world's smallest homeotherms. At full maturity, it only grows to a size of about 1.5 to 2 in (3.8 to 5.1 cm) long, half of which is the tail, and it will only grow to a weight of about 3 to 5 g (0.11 to 0.18 oz). It is gray-brown with light gray under parts. The long tail is gray with it being lighter underneath. It has small, but relatively prominent, ears.

Crawford's gray shrews are born during the summer months in a litter size of three to six. At birth, it is naked, pink and about the same size as a honeybee. It grows rapidly and reaches its adult size in about four to five weeks. As a baby, its diet consists of milk the mother produces without the aid of water. After two to three weeks, its diet changes to food brought back to the nest and then regurgitated into the juvenile's mouth. By fall, Crawford's gray shrew is out of the nest and on its own. As an adult, its diet changes from the regurgitated food to intact food it kills itself. Crawford's gray shrew will eat lizards, small mice, and scorpions, but its main food source is a wide variety of arthropods. Since this shrew has a very high rate of metabolism, it will eat up to 75% of its body weight every day, and occasionally its full body weight. This can be dangerous since it can overheat the animal. The heat produced by metabolism and gained from its surrounding environment results in a high risk of overheating.

== Characteristics ==
The shrew spends energy at very fast pace. When resting, the average shrew's heart rate is at about 1000 bit/s (beats per minute). In its respiratory rate, that is 800 breaths per minute.

The breeding season of the Crawford's gray shrew ranges from the spring to the fall to year-round. About three weeks after mating, the female shrew will give birth to three to five offspring.

The Crawford's gray shrew has poor vision, so it uses its highly sensitive ears and long nose to hunt its prey. It will also use an echolocation, similar to bats, with high-pitched squeaks to locate prey. The shrews store food during the night so they don't have to go out during the day.

When threatened, the gray shrew can emit a musky odor that makes it seem less appetizing to mammalian predators.

=== Water loss ===
Because of its diet, the Crawford's gray shrew must expel a large amount of nitrogenous waste from its body, which has a potential for a large loss of water when urinating. However, it is able to reduce water loss from urine, as well, by concentrating urea in the urine. The urine is four times more concentrated than that of a human, thus saving a huge amount of water.

This species also conserves water by being nocturnal, unlike other shrews, which hunt day and night to avoid starvation. To keep from losing any water from its victims, it will bite off the legs and then crush the prey's head so as not to kill it but to keep it fresh and unable to move.

Since water loss is a huge problem for this shrew, it has adapted by reducing two major causes of water loss. While breathing, Crawford's gray shrew inhales air warmed to body temperature and absorbs water vapor from the nasal walls. Exhaled air is cooled as the air is exiting, and the water vapor from the air condenses on the nasal passage. This keeps in more water than if the air were exhaled at body temperature. Water loss is reduced even more through respiration because it takes fewer breaths than other shrews, and has the lowest resting metabolic rate of all shrew species.

== Shelter ==
Crawford's gray shrew, unlike most shrews, do not have access to an abundant water supply. To conserve the little water that shrews do absorb, they find shelter to protect them from the harsh external temperatures. Crawford's gray shrew does not construct its own burrows or use the ones made by other animals. Instead, it builds small nests in pack rat houses or under dead agaves.

== Lifespan ==
Even with all of these adaptations to help it survive in the harsh environment of the desert, Crawford's gray shrew only lives for a relatively short period (about a year or so in the wild). Since it hunts at night, Crawford's gray shrew is susceptible to nocturnal hunters, such as snakes and owls.

As the shrew feeds on insects and intakes more food than their body mass within a short period, when deprived of food, the gray shrew will starve to death in hours.
