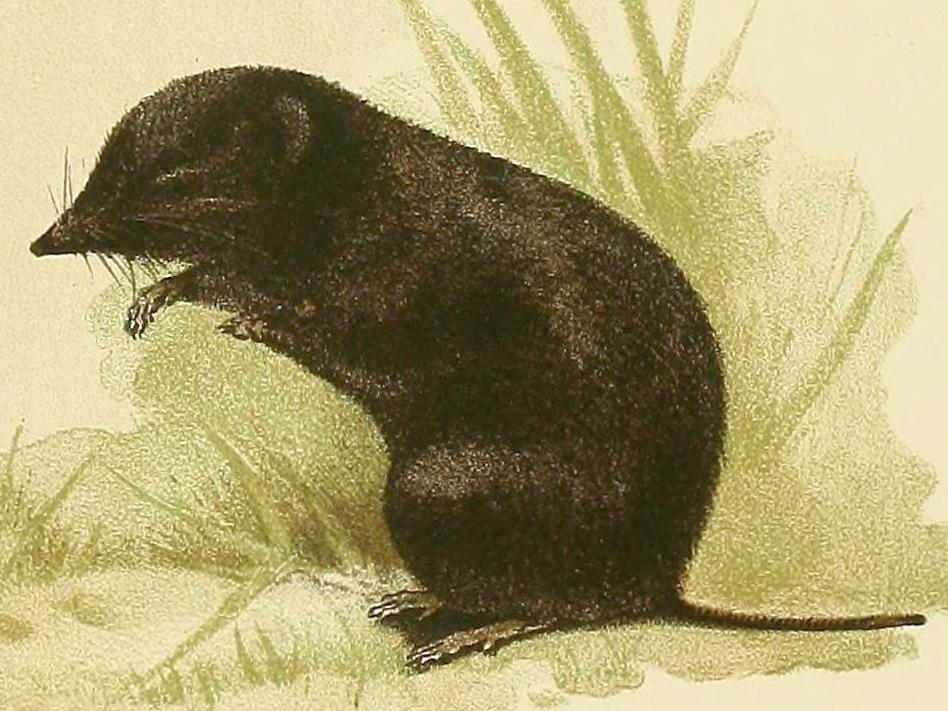
- Drawing of Myosorex blarina

Scientific classification
- Kingdom: Animalia
- Phylum: Chordata
- Class: Mammalia
- Order: Eulipotyphla
- Family: Soricidae
- Subfamily: Myosoricinae
- Genus: Myosorex; Gray, 1838

Type species
- Sorex varius Smuts, 1832

Species
- 19, see text

= Myosorex =

Myosorex (mouse shrews)

Genus of mammals

Myosorex is a mammal genus in the Soricidae (shrew) family. The genus, collectively referred to as the mouse shrews, contains these species:

- Babault's mouse shrew, M. babaulti
- Montane mouse shrew, M. blarina
- Bururi forest shrew, M. bururiensis
- Dark-footed mouse shrew, M. cafer
- Eisentraut's mouse shrew, M. eisentrauti
- Geata mouse shrew, M. geata
- Nyika mouse shrew or Nyika burrowing shrew, M. gnoskei
- Kahuzi swamp shrew, M. jejei
- Kabogo mouse shrew M. kabogoensis
- Kihaule's mouse shrew, M. kihaulei
- Long-tailed forest shrew, M. longicaudatus
- Meester's forest shrew, M. meesteri
- Oku mouse shrew, M. okuensis
- Rumpi mouse shrew, M. rumpii
- Schaller's mouse shrew, M. schalleri
- Sclater's mouse shrew, M. sclateri
- Thin mouse shrew, M. tenuis
- Forest shrew, M. varius
- Kilimanjaro mouse shrew, M. zinki
