= Dark-footed mouse shrew =

Conservation status
- Vulnerable (IUCN 3.1)

Scientific classification
- Kingdom: Animalia
- Phylum: Chordata
- Class: Mammalia
- Order: Eulipotyphla
- Family: Soricidae
- Genus: Myosorex
- Species: M. cafer

Binomial name
- Myosorex cafer (Sundevall, 1846)
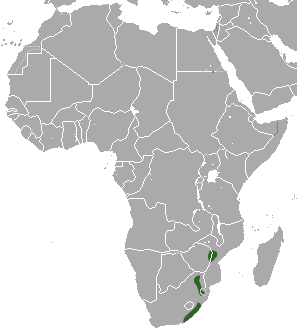
- Dark-footed mouse shrew range

Species of mammal

The dark-footed mouse shrew (Myosorex cafer) is a species of mammal in the family Soricidae found in Mozambique, South Africa, Eswatini, and Zimbabwe. Its natural habitat is subtropical or tropical moist montane forests. It was formerly sometimes called the dark-footed forest shrew.
