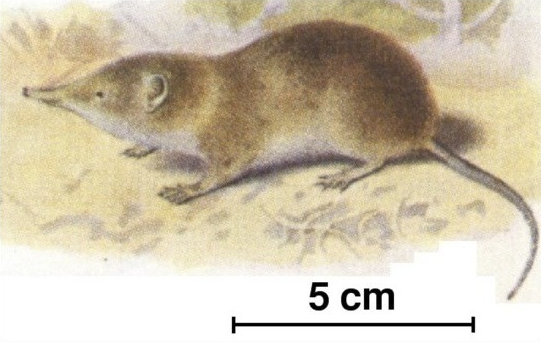
- Drawing of M. varius

Conservation status
- Least Concern (IUCN 3.1)

Scientific classification
- Domain: Eukaryota
- Kingdom: Animalia
- Phylum: Chordata
- Class: Mammalia
- Order: Eulipotyphla
- Family: Soricidae
- Genus: Myosorex
- Species: M. varius

Binomial name
- Myosorex varius (Smuts, 1832)
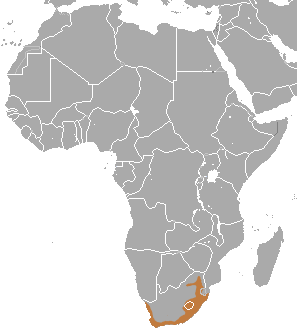
- Forest shrew range

= Myosorex varius =

Species of mammal

The forest shrew (Myosorex varius) is a species of shrew in the mouse shrew family, Soricidae. It is found in Lesotho, South Africa, and Eswatini. Its natural habitats include temperate forests, dry savanna, Mediterranean-type shrubby vegetation, and temperate grassland. The term "forest shrews" in the plural is sometimes confusingly used to collectively refer to a different genus, Sylvisorex.

== Description ==
The forest shrew grows to a length around 12.5 cm (5 in) with a tail of 4.3 cm (1.7 in) and an average mass of about 12 g (0.4 oz). In KwaZulu-Natal and the Drakensberg region, the males are larger than the females, but in the Cape Colony, the sexes are of similar sizes. This shrew is covered in short, dense fur, dark grey or brown above and paler underneath.

== Distribution and habitat ==
The forest shrew is native to South Africa, Lesotho, and Eswatini. In upland areas, it is often the commonest small mammal, but it is less common in coastal areas. It is found in a wide range of primary and secondary habitats, including forests, grassland, scrub, semidesert, karoo, and fynbos.

== Biology ==
The forest shrew excavates a shallow burrow or takes over the burrow of another small mammal. The complex of passages has several entrances and a nesting chamber containing dry grasses. These shrews are territorial and a breeding pair of shrews is often found in a nest.

The forest shrew is mainly nocturnal and is an insectivore, but its diet also includes any small invertebrates it can find, including earthworms, millipedes, centipedes, crustaceans, and spiders. The forest shrew is preyed upon by barn owls, marsh mongooses, striped weasels, and striped polecats. To avoid predation, it spends most of its time in its burrow and only leaves when it needs to feed or defecate. Its droppings are very pungent.

The breeding season varies across the forest shrew's range. In some areas, breeding takes place all year round, but in others, it is correlated with the higher rainfall which occurs in the summer, while unusually wet weather at other times of year can spark further reproductive activity.

The forest shrew often contains the brachylaimid trematode Renylaima capensis in its kidney and ureter. This parasitic fluke has been found to have a three-host lifecycle, the first intermediate host being the terrestrial slug Ariostralis nebulosa and the second, another slug Ariopelta capensis. The forest shrew feeds on both these slugs.

Feeding as it does on small invertebrates, the forest shrew tends to accumulate any environmental contaminants in its tissues. Earthworms are known to bioaccumulate lead and the levels of lead in forest shrews are found to rise when they eat contaminated earthworms. This enables the shrews to be used as bioindicators of heavy metal pollution.

== Status ==
The IUCN lists the forest shrew as being of "Least Concern" because it has a wide distribution and is common over much of its range and the population seems stable. It is able to adapt to variations in its habitat and no specific threats have been identified.
