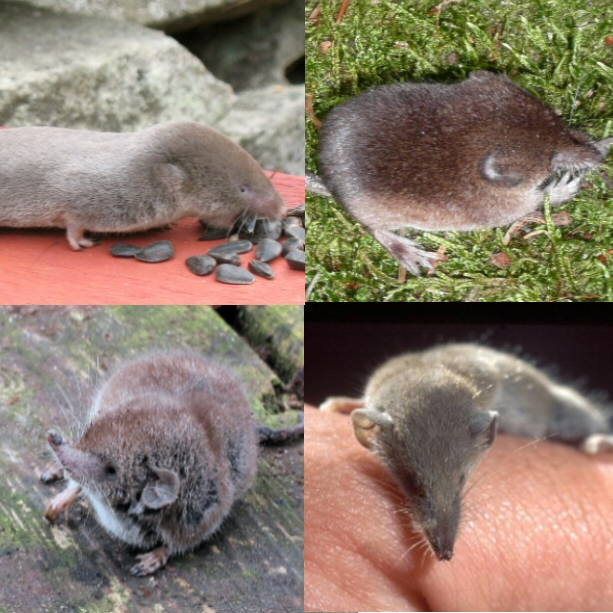

Scientific classification
- Kingdom: Animalia
- Phylum: Chordata
- Class: Mammalia
- Order: Eulipotyphla
- Family: Soricidae; G. Fischer, 1814

Type genus
- Sorex

Subfamilies
- Crocidurinae; Myosoricinae; Soricinae
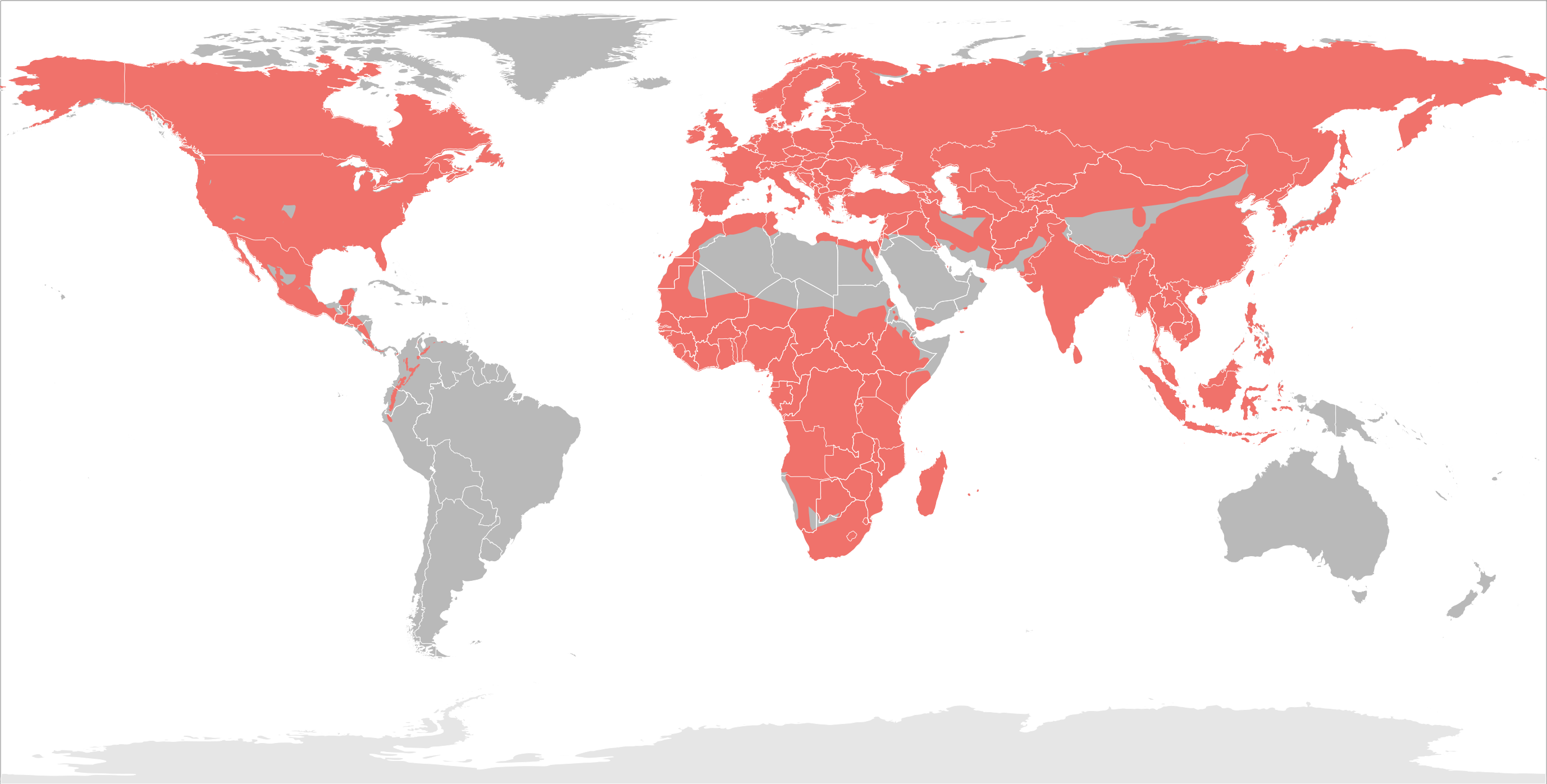
- Soricidae distribution

= Shrew =

Shrews Temporal range: Middle Eocene – Recent

Family of mammals

Shrews (family Soricidae) are small mole-like mammals classified in the order Eulipotyphla. True shrews are not to be confused with treeshrews, otter shrews, elephant shrews, West Indies shrews, or marsupial shrews and shrew opossums, which belong to different families or orders.

Although its external appearance is generally the same as a long-nosed mouse, a shrew is not a rodent, as mice are. It is, in fact, a much closer relative of hedgehogs and moles; shrews are related to rodents only in that both belong to the Boreoeutheria magnorder. Shrews have sharp, spike-like teeth, whereas rodents have gnawing front incisor teeth.

Shrews are distributed almost worldwide. Among the major tropical and temperate land masses, only New Guinea, Australia, New Zealand, and South America have no native shrews. However, as a result of the Great American Interchange, South America does have a relatively recently naturalised population, present only in the northern Andes.

The shrew family has 385 known species, making it the fourth-most species-diverse mammal family. The only mammal families with more species are the muroid rodent families (Muridae and Cricetidae) and the bat family Vespertilionidae.

== Characteristics ==
All shrews are tiny, most not larger than a mouse. The largest species is the Asian house shrew (Suncus murinus) of tropical Asia, which is about 15 cm (6 in) long and weighs around 100 g (3 1/2 oz) The Etruscan shrew (Suncus etruscus), at about 3.5 cm (1 3/8 in) and 1.8 grams (28 grains), is the smallest known living terrestrial mammal.

Water shrew skeleton

In general, shrews are terrestrial creatures that forage for seeds, insects, nuts, worms, and a variety of other foods in leaf litter and dense vegetation e.g. grass, but some specialise in climbing trees, living underground, living under snow, or even hunting in water. They have small eyes and generally poor vision, but have excellent senses of hearing and smell. They are very active animals, with voracious appetites. Shrews have unusually high metabolic rates, above that expected in comparable small mammals. For this reason, they need to eat almost constantly, like moles. Shrews in captivity can eat 1/2 to 2 times their own body weight in food daily.

They do not hibernate, but some species are capable of entering torpor. In winter, many species undergo morphological changes that drastically reduce their body weight. Shrews can lose between 30% and 50% of their body weight, shrinking the size of bones, skull, and internal organs.

Whereas rodents have gnawing incisors that grow throughout life, the teeth of shrews wear down throughout life, a problem made more extreme because they lose their milk teeth before birth, so have only one set of teeth throughout their lifetimes. In some species, exposed areas of the teeth contain iron and are dark red. The iron reinforces the surfaces that are exposed to the most stress, which helps prolong the life of the teeth. This adaptation is not found in species with lower metabolism, which do not have to eat as much and therefore do not wear down the enamel to the same degree. The only other mammals' teeth with pigmented enamel are the incisors of rodents. Apart from the first pair of incisors, which are long and sharp, and the chewing molars at the back of the mouth, the teeth of shrews are small and peg-like, and may be reduced in number. The dental formula of shrews is:3.1.1-3.31-2.0-1.1.3

Shrews are fiercely territorial, driving off rivals, and coming together only to mate. Many species dig burrows for catching food and hiding from predators, although this is not universal.

Female shrews can have up to 10 litters a year; in the tropics, they breed all year round; in temperate zones, they cease breeding only in the winter. Shrews have gestation periods of 17–32 days. The female often becomes pregnant within a day or so of giving birth, and lactates during her pregnancy, weaning one litter as the next is born. Shrews live 12 to 30 months.

A characteristic behaviour observed in many species of shrew is known as "caravanning". This is when a litter of young shrews forms a line behind the mother, each gripping the shrew in front by the fur at the base of the tail.

Shrews are unusual among mammals in a number of respects. Unlike most mammals, some species of shrews are venomous. Shrew venom is not conducted into the wound by fangs, but by grooves in the teeth. The venom contains various compounds, and the contents of the venom glands of the American short-tailed shrew are sufficient to kill 200 mice by intravenous injection. One chemical extracted from shrew venom may be potentially useful in the treatment of high blood pressure, while another compound may be useful in the treatment of some neuromuscular diseases and migraines. The saliva of the northern short-tailed shrew (Blarina brevicauda) contains soricidin, a peptide which has been studied for use in treating ovarian cancer. Also, along with the bats and toothed whales, some species of shrews use echolocation. Unlike most other mammals, shrews lack zygomatic bones (also called the jugals), so have incomplete zygomatic arches.

=== Echolocation ===
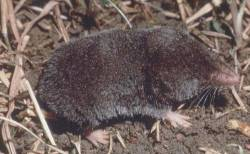
The northern short-tailed shrew is known to echolocate.

The only terrestrial mammals known to echolocate are two genera (Sorex and Blarina) of shrews, the tenrecs of Madagascar, bats, and the solenodons. These include the Eurasian or common shrew (Sorex araneus) and the American vagrant shrew (Sorex vagrans) and northern short-tailed shrew (Blarina brevicauda). These shrews emit series of ultrasonic squeaks. By nature the shrew sounds, unlike those of bats, are low-amplitude, broadband, multiharmonic, and frequency modulated. They contain no "echolocation clicks" with reverberations and would seem to be used for simple, close-range spatial orientation. In contrast to bats, shrews use echolocation only to investigate their habitats rather than additionally to pinpoint food.

Except for large and thus strongly reflecting objects, such as a big stone or tree trunk, they probably are not able to disentangle echo scenes, but rather derive information on habitat type from the overall call reverberations. This might be comparable to human hearing whether one calls into a beech forest or into a reverberant wine cellar.

== Classification ==
The 385 shrew species are placed in 26 genera, which are grouped into three living subfamilies: Crocidurinae (white-toothed shrews), Myosoricinae (African shrews), and Soricinae (red-toothed shrews). In addition, the family contains the extinct subfamilies Limnoecinae, Crocidosoricinae, Allosoricinae, and Heterosoricinae (although Heterosoricinae is also commonly considered a separate family). A new genus was tentatively erected, Nagasorex along with the description of a new species, but as of 2025 this genus and species status has not been confirmed.

- Family Soricidae
  - Subfamily Crocidurinae
    - Crocidura
    - Diplomesodon
    - Feroculus
    - Palawanosorex
    - Paracrocidura
    - Ruwenzorisorex
    - Scutisorex
    - Solisorex
    - Suncus
    - Sylvisorex
  - Subfamily Myosoricinae
    - Congosorex
    - Myosorex
    - Surdisorex
    - Nagasorex?
  - Subfamily Soricinae
    - Tribe Anourosoricini
      - Anourosorex
    - Tribe Blarinellini
      - Blarinella
    - Tribe Blarinini
      - Blarina
      - Cryptotis
    - Tribe Nectogalini
      - Chimarrogale
      - Chodsigoa
      - Episoriculus
      - Nectogale
      - Neomys
      - †Asoriculus
      - †Nesiotites
      - Soriculus
    - Tribe Notiosoricini
      - Megasorex
      - Notiosorex
    - Tribe Soricini
      - Sorex
