= Mole shrew =

A mole shrew is a shrew that resembles a mole. Species with this name include:

- Two species in the genus Surdisorex, native to Kenya:
  - Aberdare mole shrew (Surdisorex norae)
  - Mt. Kenya mole shrew (Surdisorex polulus)
- Four species in the genus Anourosorex, native to Asia:
  - Assam mole shrew (Anourosorex assamensis)
  - Giant mole shrew (Anourosorex schmidi)
  - Chinese mole shrew (Anourosorex squamipes).
  - Taiwanese mole shrew (Anourosorex yamashinai)
