= List of mammals of Kenya =

This is a list of the mammal species recorded in Kenya. Of these species, four are critically endangered, nine are endangered, eighteen are vulnerable, and fifteen are near threatened.

The following tags are used to highlight each species' conservation status as assessed by the International Union for Conservation of Nature:

EX	Extinct	No reasonable doubt that the last individual has died.
EW	Extinct in the wild	Known only to survive in captivity or as a naturalized populations well outside its previous range.
CR	Critically endangered	The species is in imminent risk of extinction in the wild.
EN	Endangered	The species is facing an extremely high risk of extinction in the wild.
VU	Vulnerable	The species is facing a high risk of extinction in the wild.
NT	Near threatened	The species does not meet any of the criteria that would categorise it as risking extinction but it is likely to do so in the future.
LC	Least concern	There are no current identifiable risks to the species.
DD	Data deficient	There is inadequate information to make an assessment of the risks to this species.

== Order: Afrosoricida (tenrecs and golden moles) ==
The order Afrosoricida contains the golden moles of southern Africa and the tenrecs of Madagascar and Africa, two families of small mammals that were traditionally part of the order Insectivora.

- Family: Tenrecidae (tenrecs)
  - Subfamily: Potamogalinae
    - Genus: Potamogale
      - Giant otter shrew, P. velox LC
- Family: Chrysochloridae
  - Subfamily: Chrysochlorinae
    - Genus: Chrysochloris
      - Stuhlmann's golden mole, C. stuhlmanni LC

== Order: Macroscelidea (elephant-shrews) ==
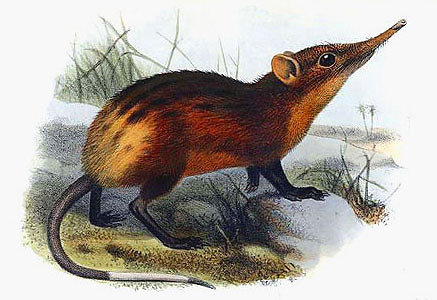
Golden-rumped elephant shrew

Often called sengis, the elephant shrews or jumping shrews are native to southern Africa. Their common English name derives from their elongated flexible snout and their resemblance to the true shrews.

- Family: Macroscelididae
  - Genus: Elephantulus
    - Short-snouted elephant shrew, E. brachyrhynchus LC
    - Rufous elephant shrew, E. rufescens LC
  - Genus: Petrodromus
    - Four-toed elephant shrew, P. tetradactylus LC
  - Genus: Rhynchocyon
    - Golden-rumped elephant shrew, R. chrysopygus EN
    - Black and rufous elephant shrew, Rhynchocyon petersi LC

== Order: Tubulidentata (aardvarks) ==
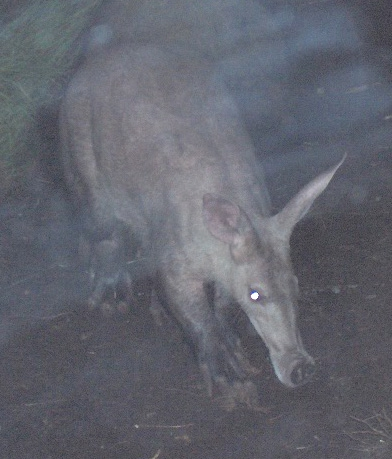
Aardvark

The order Tubulidentata consists of a single species, the aardvark. Tubulidentata are characterised by their teeth which lack a pulp cavity and form thin tubes which are continuously worn down and replaced.

- Family: Orycteropodidae
  - Genus: Orycteropus
    - Aardvark, O. afer LC

== Order: Hyracoidea (hyraxes) ==
The hyraxes are any of four species of fairly small, thickset, herbivorous mammals in the order Hyracoidea. About the size of a domestic cat they are well-furred, with rounded bodies and a stumpy tail. They are native to Africa and the Middle East.

- Family: Procaviidae
  - Genus: Dendrohyrax
    - Southern tree hyrax, D. arboreus LC
  - Genus: Heterohyrax
    - Yellow-spotted rock hyrax, H. brucei LC
  - Genus: Procavia
    - Cape hyrax, P. capensis LC

== Order: Proboscidea (elephants) ==
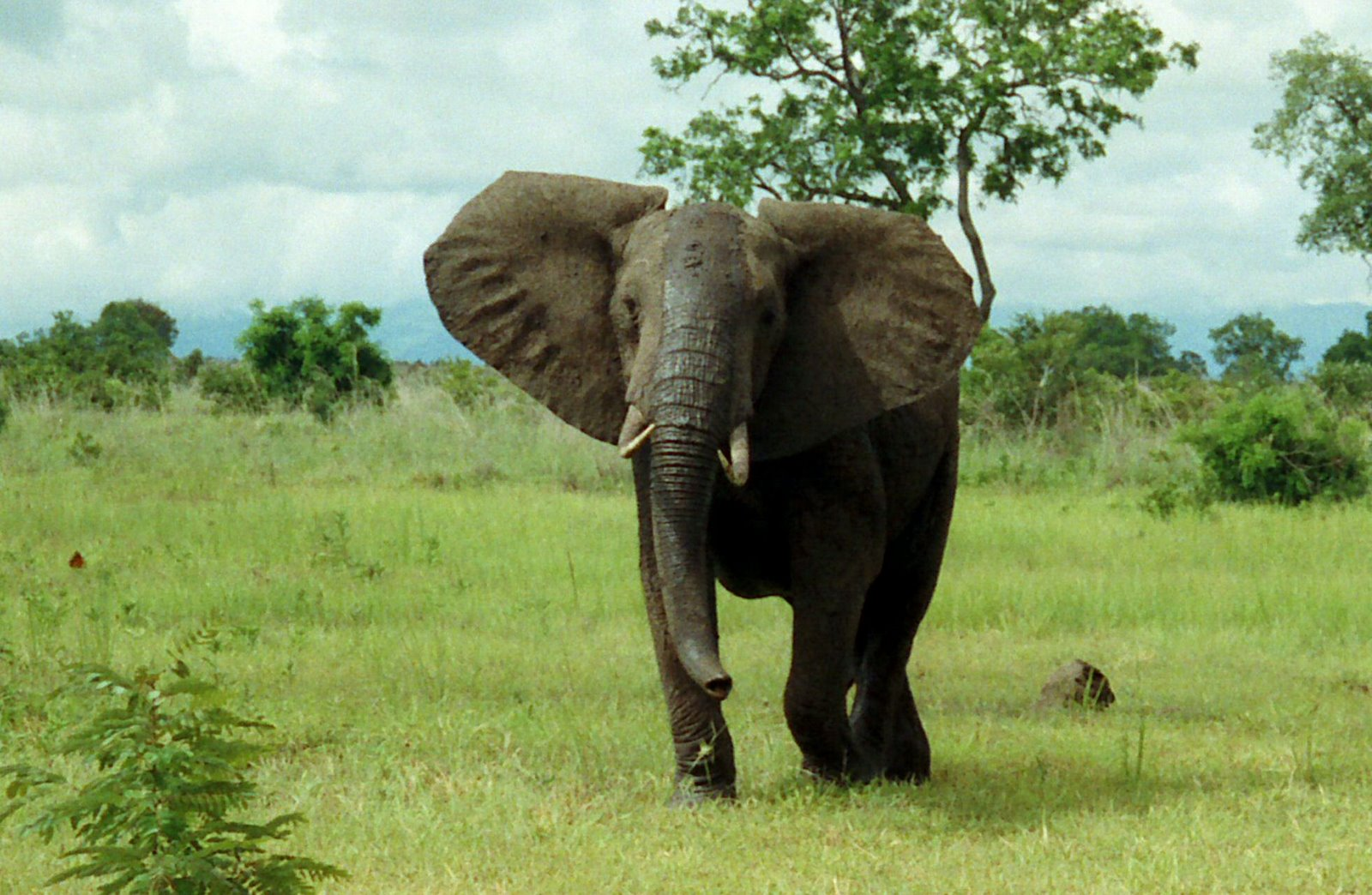
African bush elephant

The elephants comprise three living species and are the largest living land animals.

- Family: Elephantidae (elephants)
  - Genus: Loxodonta
    - African bush elephant, L. africana EN

== Order: Sirenia (manatees and dugongs) ==
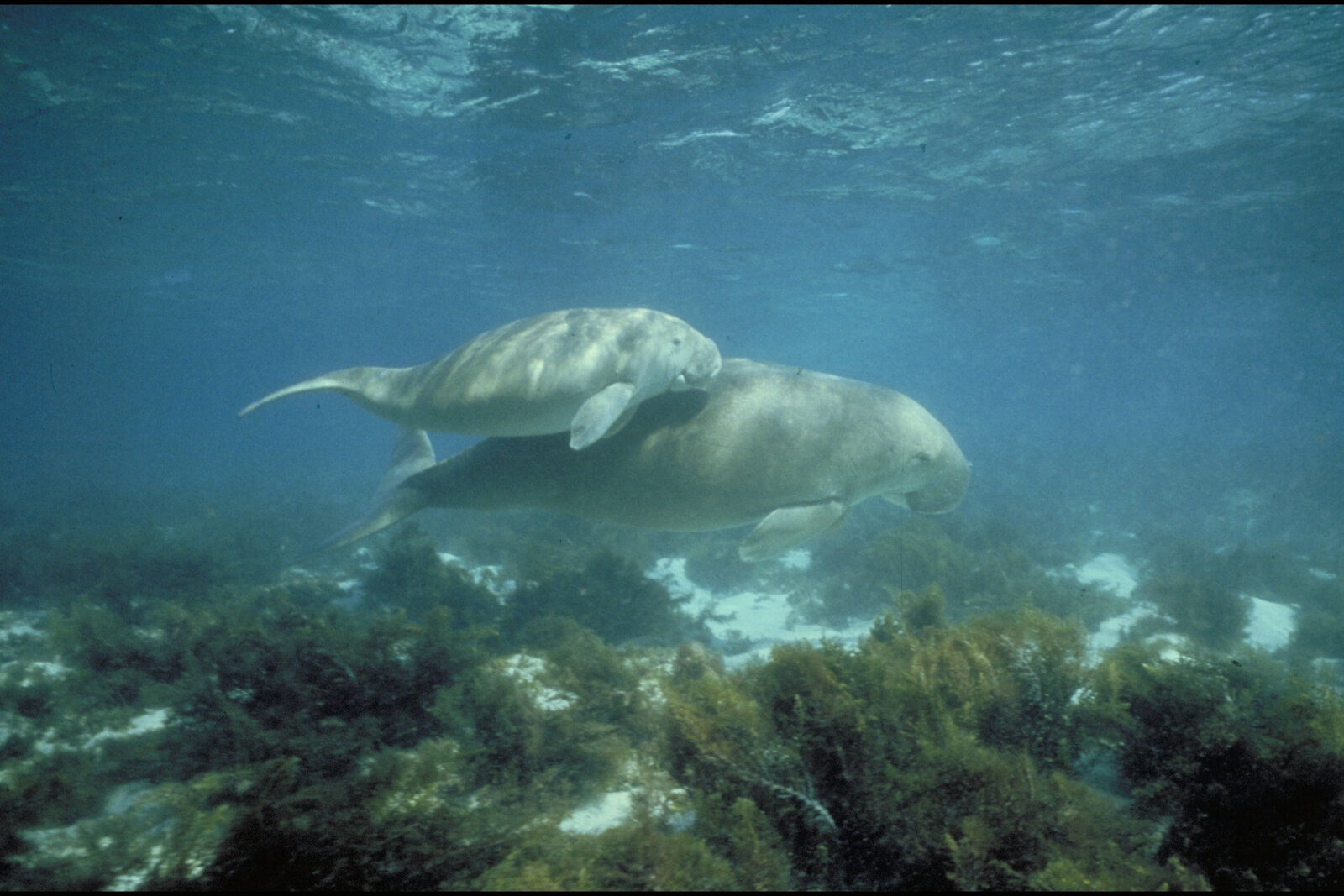
Dugongs

Sirenia is an order of fully aquatic, herbivorous mammals that inhabit rivers, estuaries, coastal marine waters, swamps, and marine wetlands. All four species are endangered.

- Family: Dugongidae
  - Genus: Dugong
    - Dugong, D. dugon VU

== Order: Primates ==
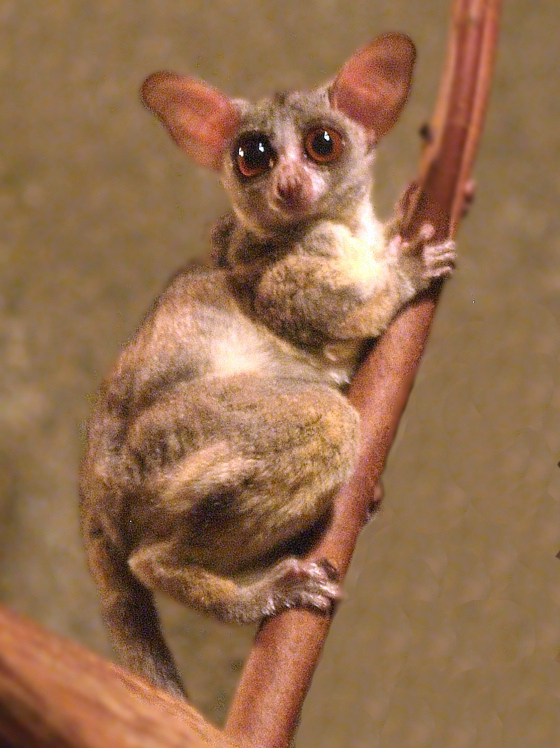
Senegal bushbaby

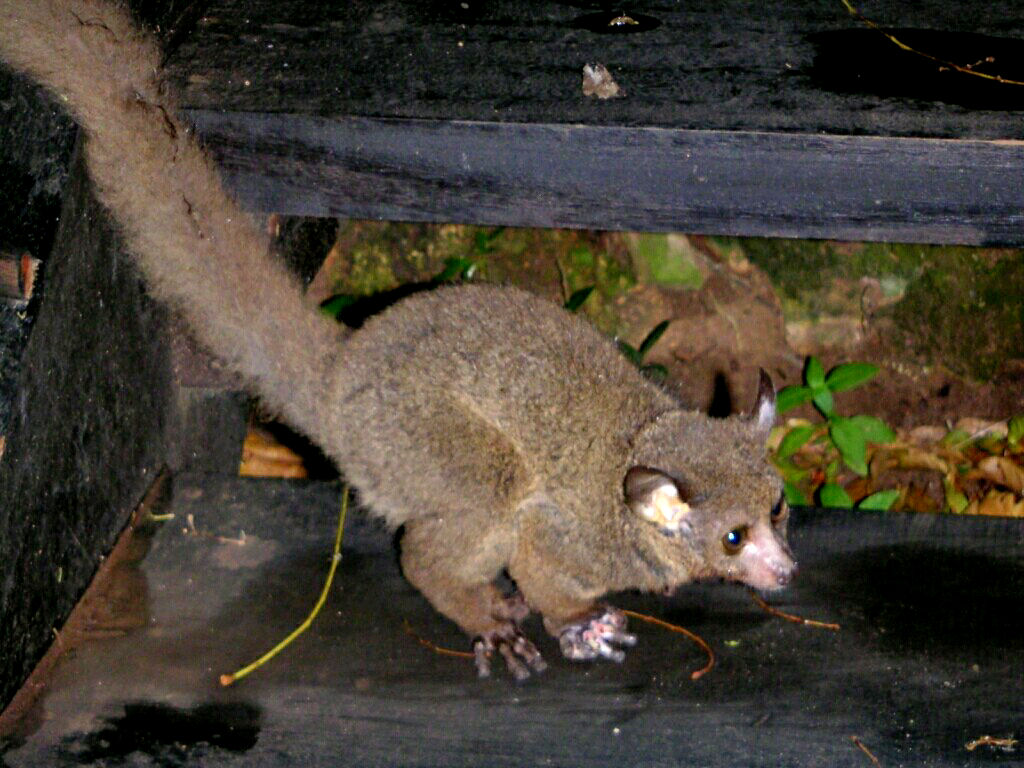
Brown greater galago

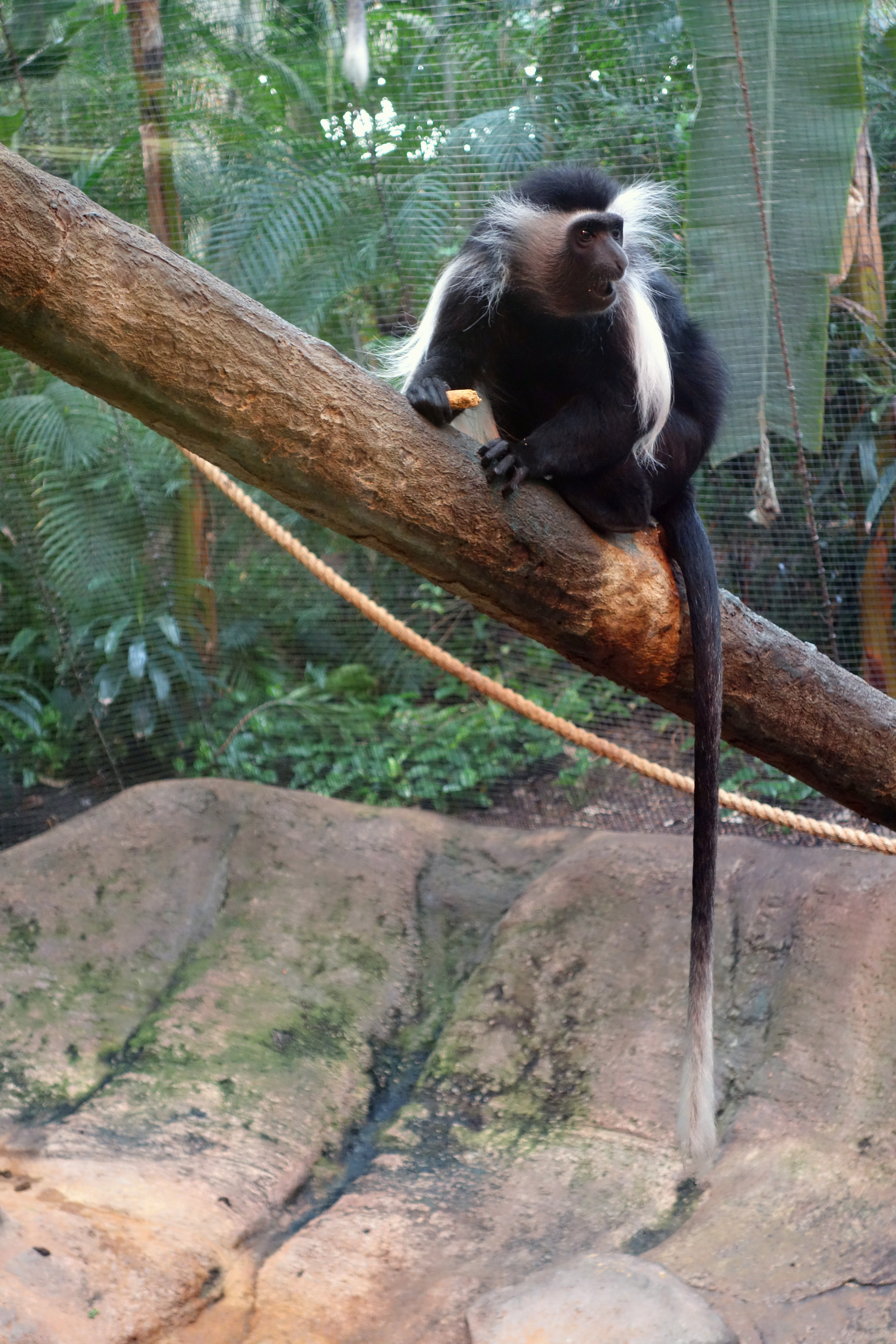
Angola colobus

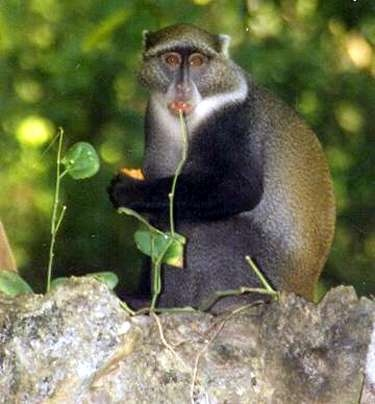
Blue monkey

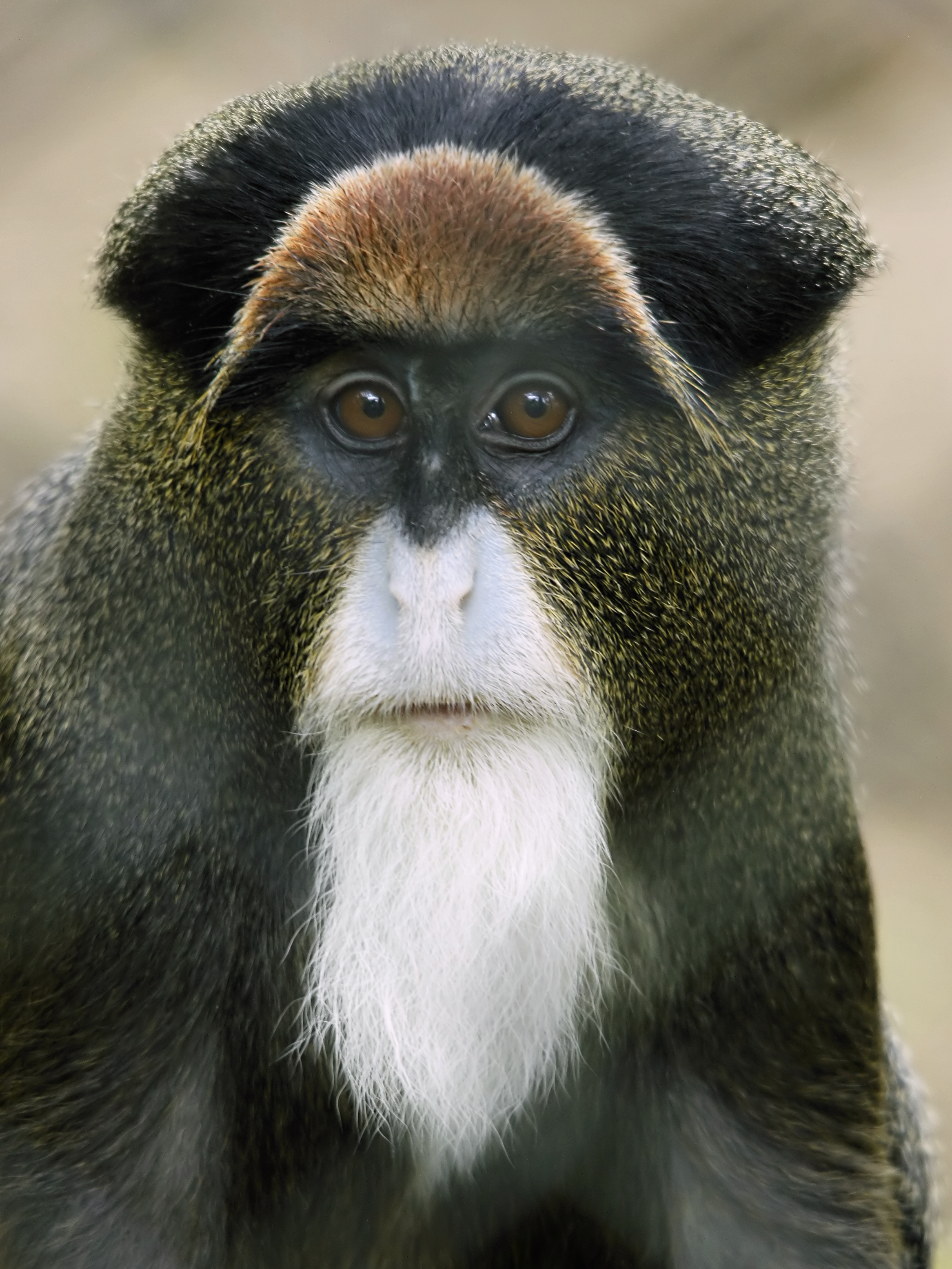
De Brazza's monkey

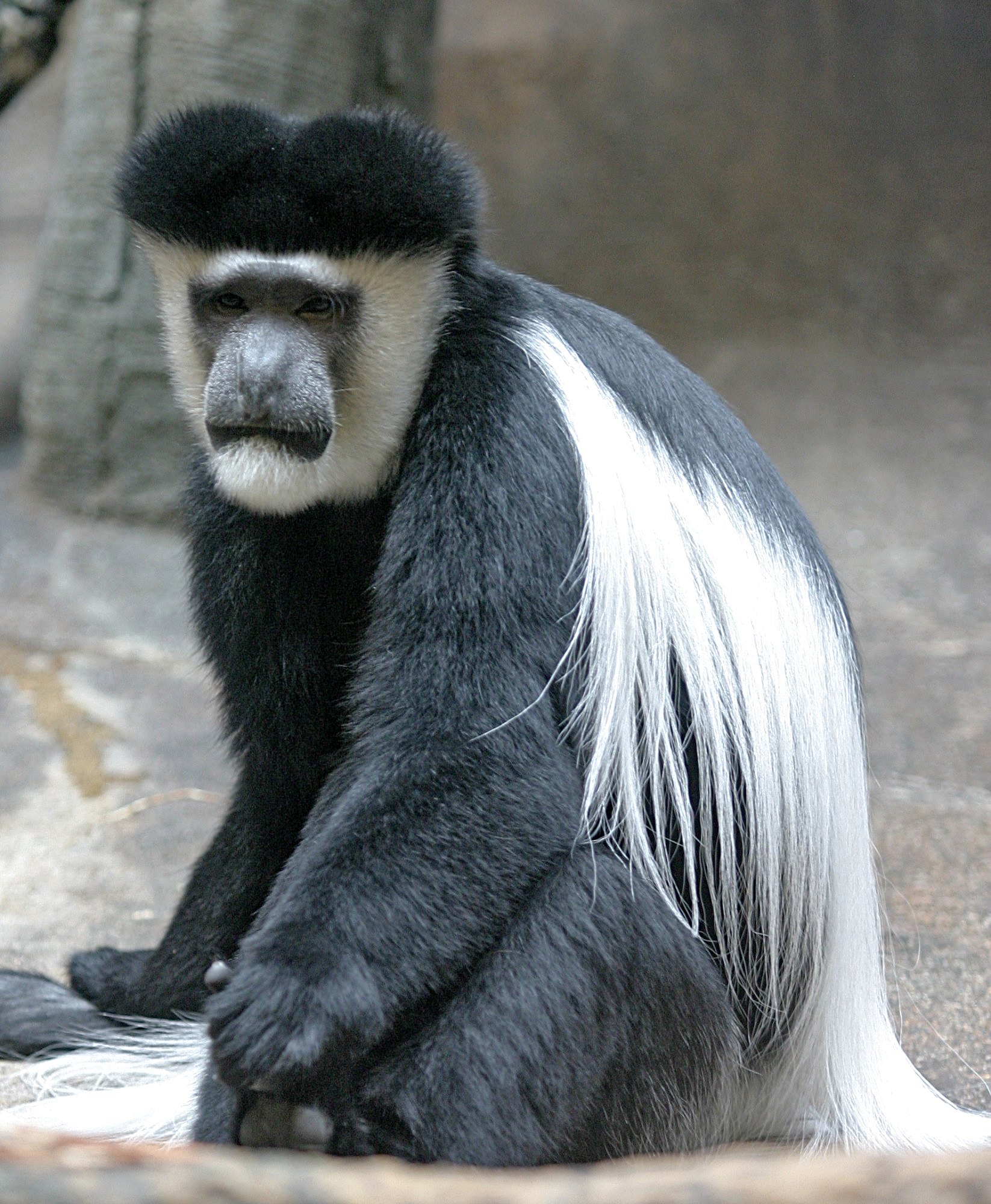
Mantled guereza

The order Primates contains humans and their closest relatives: lemurs, lorisoids, tarsiers, monkeys, and apes.

- Suborder: Strepsirrhini
  - Infraorder: Lemuriformes
    - Superfamily: Lorisoidea
      - Family: Lorisidae (lorises, bushbabies)
        - Genus: Perodicticus
          - Potto, P. potto NT
      - Family: Galagidae
        - Genus: Galago
          - Somali bushbaby, Galago gallarum
          - Senegal bushbaby, Galago senegalensis
        - Genus: Galagoides
          - Prince Demidoff's bushbaby, Galagoides demidovii
          - Thomas's bushbaby, Galagoides thomasi
          - Zanzibar bushbaby, Galagoides zanzibaricus
        - Genus: Otolemur
          - Brown greater galago, Otolemur crassicaudatus
          - Northern greater galago, Otolemur garnettii
- Suborder: Haplorhini
  - Infraorder: Simiiformes
    - Parvorder: Catarrhini
      - Superfamily: Cercopithecoidea
        - Family: Cercopithecidae (Old World monkeys)
          - Genus: Erythrocebus
            - Patas monkey, Erythrocebus patas
          - Genus: Chlorocebus
            - Vervet monkey, Chlorocebus pygerythrus
            - Tantalus monkey, Chlorocebus tantalus
          - Genus: Cercopithecus
            - Red-tailed monkey, Cercopithecus ascanius
            - Blue monkey, Cercopithecus mitis
            - De Brazza's monkey, Cercopithecus neglectus
          - Genus: Lophocebus
            - Grey-cheeked mangabey, Lophocebus albigena
          - Genus: Papio
            - Olive baboon, Papio anubis
            - Yellow baboon, Papio cynocephalus
          - Genus: Cercocebus
            - Crested mangabey, Cercocebus galeritus
          - Subfamily: Colobinae
            - Genus: Colobus
              - Angola colobus, Colobus angolensis
              - Mantled guereza, Colobus guereza
            - Genus: Procolobus
              - Tana River red colobus, Procolobus rufomitratus CR

== Order: Rodentia (rodents) ==
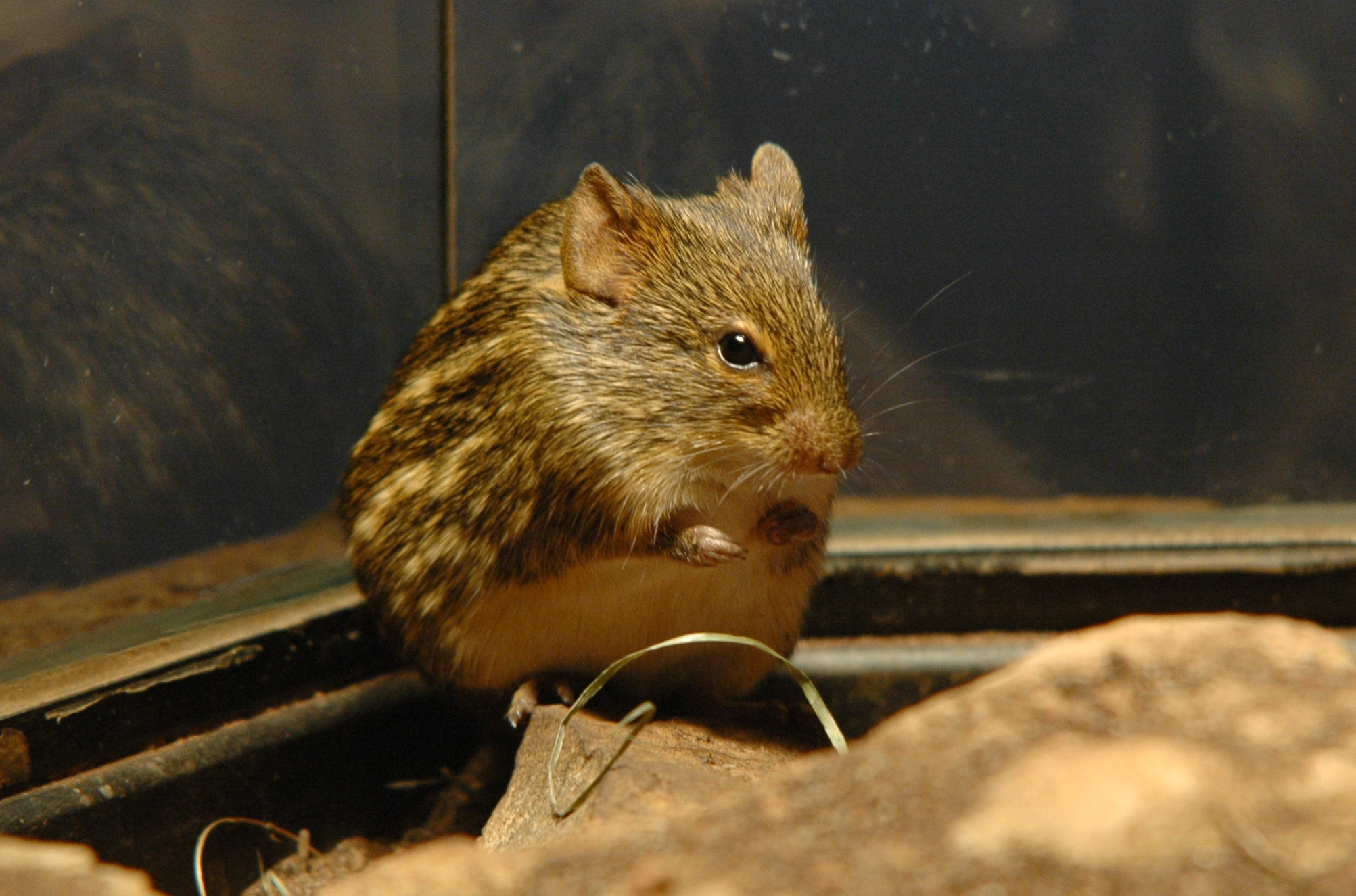
Typical striped grass mouse

Rodents make up the largest order of mammals, with over 40% of mammalian species. They have two incisors in the upper and lower jaw which grow continually and must be kept short by gnawing. Most rodents are small though the capybara can weigh up to 45 kg (99 lb).

- Suborder: Hystricognathi
  - Family: Bathyergidae
    - Genus: Heliophobius
      - Silvery mole-rat, Heliophobius argenteocinereus LC
    - Genus: Heterocephalus
      - Naked mole-rat, Heterocephalus glaber LC
  - Family: Hystricidae (Old World porcupines)
    - Genus: Atherurus
      - African brush-tailed porcupine, Atherurus africanus LC
    - Genus: Hystrix
      - Cape porcupine, Hystrix africaeaustralis LC
      - Crested porcupine, Hystrix cristata LC
  - Family: Thryonomyidae (cane rats)
    - Genus: Thryonomys
      - Lesser cane rat, Thryonomys gregorianus LC
      - Greater cane rat, Thryonomys swinderianus LC
- Suborder: Sciurognathi
  - Family: Anomaluridae
    - Subfamily: Anomalurinae
      - Genus: Anomalurus
        - Lord Derby's scaly-tailed squirrel, Anomalurus derbianus LC
  - Family: Pedetidae (spring hare)
    - Genus: Pedetes
      - Springhare, Pedetes surdaster LC
  - Family: Sciuridae (squirrels)
    - Subfamily: Xerinae
      - Tribe: Xerini
        - Genus: Xerus
          - Striped ground squirrel, Xerus erythropus LC
          - Unstriped ground squirrel, Xerus rutilus LC
      - Tribe: Protoxerini
        - Genus: Heliosciurus
          - Gambian sun squirrel, Heliosciurus gambianus LC
          - Red-legged sun squirrel, Heliosciurus rufobrachium LC
          - Zanj sun squirrel, Heliosciurus undulatus DD
        - Genus: Paraxerus
          - Boehm's bush squirrel, Paraxerus boehmi LC
          - Striped bush squirrel, Paraxerus flavovittis DD
          - Ochre bush squirrel, Paraxerus ochraceus LC
          - Red bush squirrel, Paraxerus palliatus LC
        - Genus: Protoxerus
          - Forest giant squirrel, Protoxerus stangeri LC
  - Family: Gliridae (dormice)
    - Subfamily: Graphiurinae
      - Genus: Graphiurus
        - Small-eared dormouse, Graphiurus microtis LC
        - Kellen's dormouse, Graphiurus kelleni LC
  - Family: Spalacidae
    - Subfamily: Tachyoryctinae
      - Genus: Tachyoryctes
        - Northeast African mole-rat, Tachyoryctes splendens
        - Mianzini African mole-rat, Tachyoryctes annectens
        - Aberdare Mountains African mole-rat, Tachyoryctes audax
        - Demon African mole-rat, Tachyoryctes daemon
        - Kenyan African mole-rat, Tachyoryctes ibeanus
        - Navivasha African mole-rat, Tachyoryctes naivashae
        - King African mole-rat, Tachyoryctes rex
        - Rudd's African mole-rat, Tachyoryctes ruddi
        - Embi African mole-rat, Tachyoryctes spalacinus
        - Storey's African mole-rat, Tachyoryctes storeyi
  - Family: Nesomyidae
    - Subfamily: Dendromurinae
      - Genus: Dendromus
        - Montane African climbing mouse, Dendromus insignis LC
        - Brants's climbing mouse, Dendromus mesomelas LC
        - Chestnut climbing mouse, Dendromus mystacalis LC
      - Genus: Steatomys
        - Tiny fat mouse, Steatomys parvus LC
    - Subfamily: Cricetomyinae
      - Genus: Beamys
        - Lesser hamster-rat, Beamys hindei NT
      - Genus: Cricetomys
        - Emin's pouched rat, Cricetomys emini LC
        - Gambian pouched rat, Cricetomys gambianus LC
      - Genus: Saccostomus
        - Mearns's pouched mouse, Saccostomus mearnsi LC
  - Family: Cricetidae
    - Subfamily: Lophiomyinae
      - Genus: Lophiomys
        - Maned rat, Lophiomys imhausi LC
  - Family: Muridae (mice, rats, voles, gerbils, hamsters, etc.)
    - Subfamily: Deomyinae
      - Genus: Acomys
        - Gray spiny mouse, Acomys cineraceus LC
        - Fiery spiny mouse, Acomys ignitus LC
        - Kemp's spiny mouse, Acomys kempi LC
        - Louise's spiny mouse, Acomys louisae LC
        - Percival's spiny mouse, Acomys percivali LC
        - Wilson's spiny mouse, Acomys wilsoni LC
      - Genus: Lophuromys
        - Yellow-spotted brush-furred rat, Lophuromys flavopunctatus LC
        - Rusty-bellied brush-furred rat, Lophuromys sikapusi LC
      - Genus: Uranomys
        - Rudd's mouse, Uranomys ruddi LC
    - Subfamily: Otomyinae
      - Genus: Otomys
        - Angoni vlei rat, Otomys angoniensis LC
        - Barbour's vlei rat, Otomys barbouri EN
        - Dollman's vlei rat, Otomys dollmani DD
        - Mount Elgon vlei rat, Otomys jacksoni EN
        - Tanzanian vlei rat, Otomys lacustris NT
        - Afroalpine vlei rat, Otomys orestes DD
        - Thomas's vlei rat, Otomys thomasi VU
        - Tropical vlei rat, Otomys tropicalis LC
        - Mount Kilimanjaro vlei rat, Otomys zinki VU
    - Subfamily: Gerbillinae
      - Genus: Gerbillus
        - Botta's gerbil, Gerbillus bottai DD
        - Agag gerbil, Gerbillus agag DD
        - Harwood's gerbil, Gerbillus harwoodi LC
        - Cushioned gerbil, Gerbillus pulvinatus LC
        - Least gerbil, Gerbillus pusillus LC
      - Genus: Tatera
        - Boehm's gerbil, Tatera boehmi LC
        - Kemp's gerbil, Tatera kempi LC
        - Bushveld gerbil, Tatera leucogaster LC
        - Black-tailed gerbil, Tatera nigricauda LC
        - Phillips's gerbil, Tatera phillipsi LC
        - Fringe-tailed gerbil, Tatera robusta LC
        - Savanna gerbil, Tatera valida LC
      - Genus: Taterillus
        - Emin's gerbil, Taterillus emini LC
        - Harrington's gerbil, Taterillus harringtoni LC
    - Subfamily: Murinae
      - Genus: Aethomys
        - Red rock rat, Aethomys chrysophilus LC
        - Hinde's rock rat, Aethomys hindei LC
        - Kaiser's rock rat, Aethomys kaiseri LC
      - Genus: Arvicanthis
        - Nairobi grass rat, Arvicanthis nairobae LC
        - African grass rat, Arvicanthis niloticus LC
        - Neumann's grass rat, Arvicanthis neumanni DD
      - Genus: Colomys
        - African wading rat, Colomys goslingi LC
      - Genus: Dasymys
        - African marsh rat, Dasymys incomtus LC
      - Genus: Grammomys
        - Gray-headed thicket rat, Grammomys caniceps DD
        - Woodland thicket rat, Grammomys dolichurus LC
        - Giant thicket rat, Grammomys gigas EN
        - Ruwenzori thicket rat, Grammomys ibeanus LC
        - Macmillan's thicket rat, Grammomys macmillani LC
      - Genus: Hylomyscus
        - Montane wood mouse, Hylomyscus denniae LC
        - Stella wood mouse, Hylomyscus stella LC
      - Genus: Lemniscomys
        - Buffoon striped grass mouse, Lemniscomys macculus LC
        - Single-striped grass mouse, Lemniscomys rosalia LC
        - Typical striped grass mouse, Lemniscomys striatus LC
        - Heuglin's striped grass mouse, Lemniscomys zebra LC
      - Genus: Mastomys
        - Guinea multimammate mouse, Mastomys erythroleucus LC
        - Natal multimammate mouse, Mastomys natalensis LC
        - Dwarf multimammate mouse, Mastomys pernanus DD
      - Genus: Mus
        - Mahomet mouse, Mus mahomet LC
        - African pygmy mouse, Mus minutoides LC
        - Peters's mouse, Mus setulosus LC
        - Thomas's pygmy mouse, Mus sorella LC
        - Delicate mouse, Mus tenellus LC
        - Gray-bellied pygmy mouse, Mus triton LC
      - Genus: Mylomys
        - African groove-toothed rat, Mylomys dybowskii LC
      - Genus: Myomyscus
        - Brockman's rock mouse, Myomyscus brockmani LC
      - Genus: Oenomys
        - Common rufous-nosed rat, Oenomys hypoxanthus LC
      - Genus: Pelomys
        - Creek groove-toothed swamp rat, Pelomys fallax LC
        - Hopkins's groove-toothed swamp rat, Pelomys hopkinsi VU
      - Genus: Praomys
        - Delectable soft-furred mouse, Praomys delectorum NT
        - Jackson's soft-furred mouse, Praomys jacksoni LC
        - Misonne's soft-furred mouse, Praomys misonnei LC
      - Genus: Rhabdomys
        - Four-striped grass mouse, Rhabdomys pumilio LC
      - Genus: Thallomys
        - Loring's rat, Thallomys loringi LC
        - Acacia rat, Thallomys paedulcus LC
      - Genus: Zelotomys
        - Hildegarde's broad-headed mouse, Zelotomys hildegardeae LC

== Order: Lagomorpha (lagomorphs) ==
The lagomorphs comprise two families, Leporidae (hares and rabbits), and Ochotonidae (pikas). Though they can resemble rodents, and were classified as a superfamily in that order until the early 20th century, they have since been considered a separate order. They differ from rodents in a number of physical characteristics, such as having four incisors in the upper jaw rather than two.

- Family: Leporidae (rabbits, hares)
  - Genus: Pronolagus
    - Smith's red rock hare, P. rupestris
  - Genus: Lepus
    - Cape hare, L. capensis LC
    - Ethiopian hare, L. fagani LC
    - African savanna hare, L. victoriae LC

== Order: Erinaceomorpha (hedgehogs and gymnures) ==
The order Erinaceomorpha contains a single family, Erinaceidae, which comprise the hedgehogs and gymnures. The hedgehogs are easily recognised by their spines while gymnures look more like large rats.

- Family: Erinaceidae (hedgehogs)
  - Subfamily: Erinaceinae
    - Genus: Atelerix
      - Four-toed hedgehog, Atelerix albiventris

== Order: Soricomorpha (shrews, moles, and solenodons) ==
The "shrew-forms" are insectivorous mammals. The shrews and solenodons closely resemble mice while the moles are stout-bodied burrowers.

- Family: Soricidae (shrews)
  - Subfamily: Crocidurinae
    - Genus: Crocidura
      - East African highland shrew, Crocidura allex LC
      - Bottego's shrew, Crocidura bottegi DD
      - Elgon shrew, Crocidura elgonius LC
      - Fischer's shrew, Crocidura fischeri DD
      - Savanna shrew, Crocidura fulvastra LC
      - Smoky white-toothed shrew, Crocidura fumosa LC
      - Bicolored musk shrew, Crocidura fuscomurina LC
      - Hildegarde's shrew, Crocidura hildegardeae LC
      - Jackson's shrew, Crocidura jacksoni LC
      - Butiaba naked-tailed shrew, Crocidura littoralis LC
      - Moonshine shrew, Crocidura luna LC
      - MacArthur's shrew, Crocidura macarthuri LC
      - Nyiro shrew, Crocidura macowi DD
      - Dark shrew, Crocidura maurisca DD
      - Kilimanjaro shrew, Crocidura monax DD
      - Montane white-toothed shrew, Crocidura montis LC
      - Savanna dwarf shrew, Crocidura nanilla LC
      - African black shrew, Crocidura nigrofusca LC
      - African giant shrew, Crocidura olivieri LC
      - Small-footed shrew, Crocidura parvipes LC
      - Rainey's shrew, Crocidura raineyi DD
      - Ugandan lowland shrew, Crocidura selina LC
      - Turbo shrew, Crocidura turba LC
      - Ultimate shrew, Crocidura ultima DD
      - Savanna path shrew, Crocidura viaria LC
      - Voi shrew, Crocidura voi LC
      - Xanthippe's shrew, Crocidura xantippe LC
      - Yankari shrew, Crocidura yankariensis LC
      - Zaphir's shrew, Crocidura zaphiri DD
    - Genus: Suncus
      - Least dwarf shrew, Suncus infinitesimus LC
      - Greater dwarf shrew, Suncus lixus LC
    - Genus: Sylvisorex
      - Grant's forest shrew, Sylvisorex granti LC
      - Climbing shrew, Sylvisorex megalura LC
  - Subfamily: Myosoricinae
    - Genus: Surdisorex
      - Aberdare mole shrew, Surdisorex norae VU
      - Mount Kenya mole shrew, Surdisorex polulus VU

== Order: Chiroptera (bats) ==
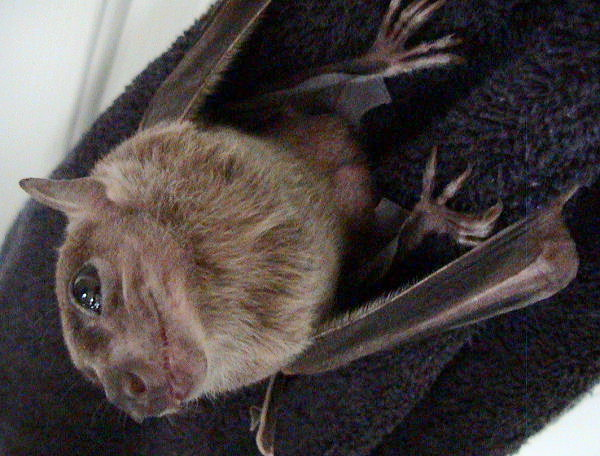
Egyptian fruit bat

The bats' most distinguishing feature is that their forelimbs are developed as wings, making them the only mammals capable of flight. Bat species account for about 20% of all mammals.

- Family: Pteropodidae (flying foxes, Old World fruit bats)
  - Subfamily: Pteropodinae
    - Genus: Eidolon
      - Straw-coloured fruit bat, Eidolon helvum LC
    - Genus: Epomophorus
      - Ethiopian epauletted fruit bat, Epomophorus labiatus LC
      - East African epauletted fruit bat, Epomophorus minimus LC
      - Wahlberg's epauletted fruit bat, Epomophorus wahlbergi LC
    - Genus: Hypsignathus
      - Hammer-headed bat, Hypsignathus monstrosus LC
    - Genus: Lissonycteris
      - Angolan rousette, Lissonycteris angolensis LC
    - Genus: Micropteropus
      - Peters's dwarf epauletted fruit bat, Micropteropus pusillus LC
    - Genus: Myonycteris
      - East African little collared fruit bat, Myonycteris relicta VU
    - Genus: Rousettus
      - Egyptian fruit bat, Rousettus aegyptiacus LC
      - Long-haired rousette, Rousettus lanosus LC
- Family: Vespertilionidae
  - Subfamily: Kerivoulinae
    - Genus: Kerivoula
      - Damara woolly bat, Kerivoula argentata LC
      - Lesser woolly bat, Kerivoula lanosa LC
      - Smith's woolly bat, Kerivoula smithi LC
  - Subfamily: Myotinae
    - Genus: Myotis
      - Rufous mouse-eared bat, Myotis bocagii LC
      - Cape hairy bat, Myotis tricolor LC
      - Welwitsch's bat, Myotis welwitschii LC
  - Subfamily: Vespertilioninae
    - Genus: Eptesicus
      - Long-tailed house bat, Eptesicus hottentotus LC
    - Genus: Glauconycteris
      - Silvered bat, Glauconycteris argentata LC
      - Beatrix's bat, Glauconycteris beatrix NT
      - Allen's spotted bat, Glauconycteris humeralis DD
      - Kenyan wattled bat, Glauconycteris kenyacola DD
      - Abo bat, Glauconycteris poensis LC
      - Butterfly bat, Glauconycteris variegata LC
    - Genus: Hypsugo
      - Broad-headed pipistrelle, Hypsugo crassulus LC
      - Eisentraut's pipistrelle, Hypsugo eisentrauti DD
    - Genus: Laephotis
      - De Winton's long-eared bat, Laephotis wintoni LC
    - Genus: Mimetillus
      - Moloney's mimic bat, Mimetillus moloneyi LC
    - Genus: Neoromicia
      - Cape serotine, Neoromicia capensis LC
      - Heller's pipistrelle, Neoromicia helios DD
      - Melck's house bat, Neoromicia melckorum DD
      - Banana pipistrelle, Neoromicia nanus LC
      - Rendall's serotine, Neoromicia rendalli LC
      - Somali serotine, Neoromicia somalicus LC
      - White-winged serotine, Neoromicia tenuipinnis LC
      - Zulu serotine, Neoromicia zuluensis LC
    - Genus: Nycticeinops
      - Schlieffen's bat, Nycticeinops schlieffeni LC
    - Genus: Pipistrellus
      - Mount Gargues pipistrelle, Pipistrellus aero VU
      - Egyptian pipistrelle, Pipistrellus deserti LC
      - Tiny pipistrelle, Pipistrellus nanulus LC
      - Rüppell's pipistrelle, Pipistrellus rueppelli LC
      - Rusty pipistrelle, Pipistrellus rusticus LC
    - Genus: Scotoecus
      - White-bellied lesser house bat, Scotoecus albigula DD
      - Light-winged lesser house bat, Scotoecus albofuscus DD
      - Hinde's lesser house bat, Scotoecus hindei DD
      - Dark-winged lesser house bat, Scotoecus hirundo DD
    - Genus: Scotophilus
      - African yellow bat, Scotophilus dinganii LC
      - White-bellied yellow bat, Scotophilus leucogaster LC
      - Schreber's yellow bat, Scotophilus nigrita NT
      - Nut-colored yellow bat, Scotophilus nux LC
      - Greenish yellow bat, Scotophilus viridis LC
  - Subfamily: Miniopterinae
    - Genus: Miniopterus
      - African long-fingered bat, M. africanus LC
      - Lesser long-fingered bat, M. fraterculus LC
      - Greater long-fingered bat, M. inflatus LC
      - Least long-fingered bat, M. minor NT
      - Natal long-fingered bat, M. natalensis NT
      - Common bent-wing bat, M. schreibersii VU
- Family: Rhinopomatidae
  - Genus: Rhinopoma
    - Lesser mouse-tailed bat, Rhinopoma hardwickei LC
    - Macinnes's mouse-tailed bat, Rhinopoma macinnesi VU
- Family: Molossidae
  - Genus: Chaerephon
    - Gland-tailed free-tailed bat, Chaerephon bemmeleni LC
    - Spotted free-tailed bat, Chaerephon bivittata LC
    - Chapin's free-tailed bat, Chaerephon chapini DD
    - Lappet-eared free-tailed bat, Chaerephon major LC
    - Little free-tailed bat, Chaerephon pumila LC
    - Russet free-tailed bat, Chaerephon russata NT
  - Genus: Mops
    - Sierra Leone free-tailed bat, Mops brachypterus LC
    - Angolan free-tailed bat, Mops condylurus LC
    - Mongalla free-tailed bat, Mops demonstrator NT
    - Midas free-tailed bat, Mops midas LC
    - Dwarf free-tailed bat, Mops nanulus LC
    - Railer bat, Mops thersites LC
  - Genus: Otomops
    - Large-eared free-tailed bat, Otomops martiensseni NT
  - Genus: Platymops
    - Peters's flat-headed bat, Platymops setiger DD
  - Genus: Tadarida
    - Egyptian free-tailed bat, Tadarida aegyptiaca LC
    - Madagascan large free-tailed bat, Tadarida fulminans LC
    - Kenyan big-eared free-tailed bat, Tadarida lobata DD
    - African giant free-tailed bat, Tadarida ventralis NT
- Family: Emballonuridae
  - Genus: Coleura
    - African sheath-tailed bat, Coleura afra LC
  - Genus: Saccolaimus
    - Pel's pouched bat, Saccolaimus peli NT
  - Genus: Taphozous
    - Hamilton's tomb bat, Taphozous hamiltoni NT
    - Hildegarde's tomb bat, Taphozous hildegardeae VU
    - Mauritian tomb bat, Taphozous mauritianus LC
    - Naked-rumped tomb bat, Taphozous nudiventris LC
    - Egyptian tomb bat, Taphozous perforatus LC
- Family: Nycteridae
  - Genus: Nycteris
    - Bate's slit-faced bat, Nycteris arge LC
    - Andersen's slit-faced bat, Nycteris aurita DD
    - Large slit-faced bat, Nycteris grandis LC
    - Hairy slit-faced bat, Nycteris hispida LC
    - Large-eared slit-faced bat, Nycteris macrotis LC
    - Dwarf slit-faced bat, Nycteris nana LC
    - Egyptian slit-faced bat, Nycteris thebaica LC
- Family: Megadermatidae
  - Genus: Cardioderma
    - Heart-nosed bat, Cardioderma cor LC
  - Genus: Lavia
    - Yellow-winged bat, Lavia frons LC
- Family: Rhinolophidae
  - Subfamily: Rhinolophinae
    - Genus: Rhinolophus
      - Halcyon horseshoe bat, Rhinolophus alcyone LC
      - Geoffroy's horseshoe bat, Rhinolophus clivosus LC
      - Darling's horseshoe bat, Rhinolophus darlingi LC
      - Decken's horseshoe bat, Rhinolophus deckenii DD
      - Eloquent horseshoe bat, Rhinolophus eloquens DD
      - Rüppell's horseshoe bat, Rhinolophus fumigatus LC
      - Hildebrandt's horseshoe bat, Rhinolophus hildebrandti LC
      - Lander's horseshoe bat, Rhinolophus landeri LC
      - Bushveld horseshoe bat, Rhinolophus simulator LC
  - Subfamily: Hipposiderinae
    - Genus: Cloeotis
      - Percival's trident bat, Cloeotis percivali VU
    - Genus: Hipposideros
      - Sundevall's roundleaf bat, Hipposideros caffer LC
      - Greater roundleaf bat, Hipposideros camerunensis DD
      - Cyclops roundleaf bat, Hipposideros cyclops LC
      - Giant roundleaf bat, Hipposideros gigas LC
      - Commerson's roundleaf bat, Hipposideros marungensis NT
      - Ethiopian large-eared roundleaf bat, Hipposideros megalotis NT
      - Noack's roundleaf bat, Hipposideros ruber LC
    - Genus: Triaenops
      - Persian trident bat, Triaenops persicus LC

== Order: Pholidota (pangolins) ==
The order Pholidota comprises the eight species of pangolin. Pangolins are anteaters and have the powerful claws, elongated snout and long tongue seen in the other unrelated anteater species.

- Family: Manidae
  - Genus: Phataginus
    - Tree pangolin, P. tricuspis EN
  - Genus Smutsia
    - Giant pangolin, S. gigantea EN
    - Ground pangolin, S. temminckii VU

== Order: Cetacea (whales) ==
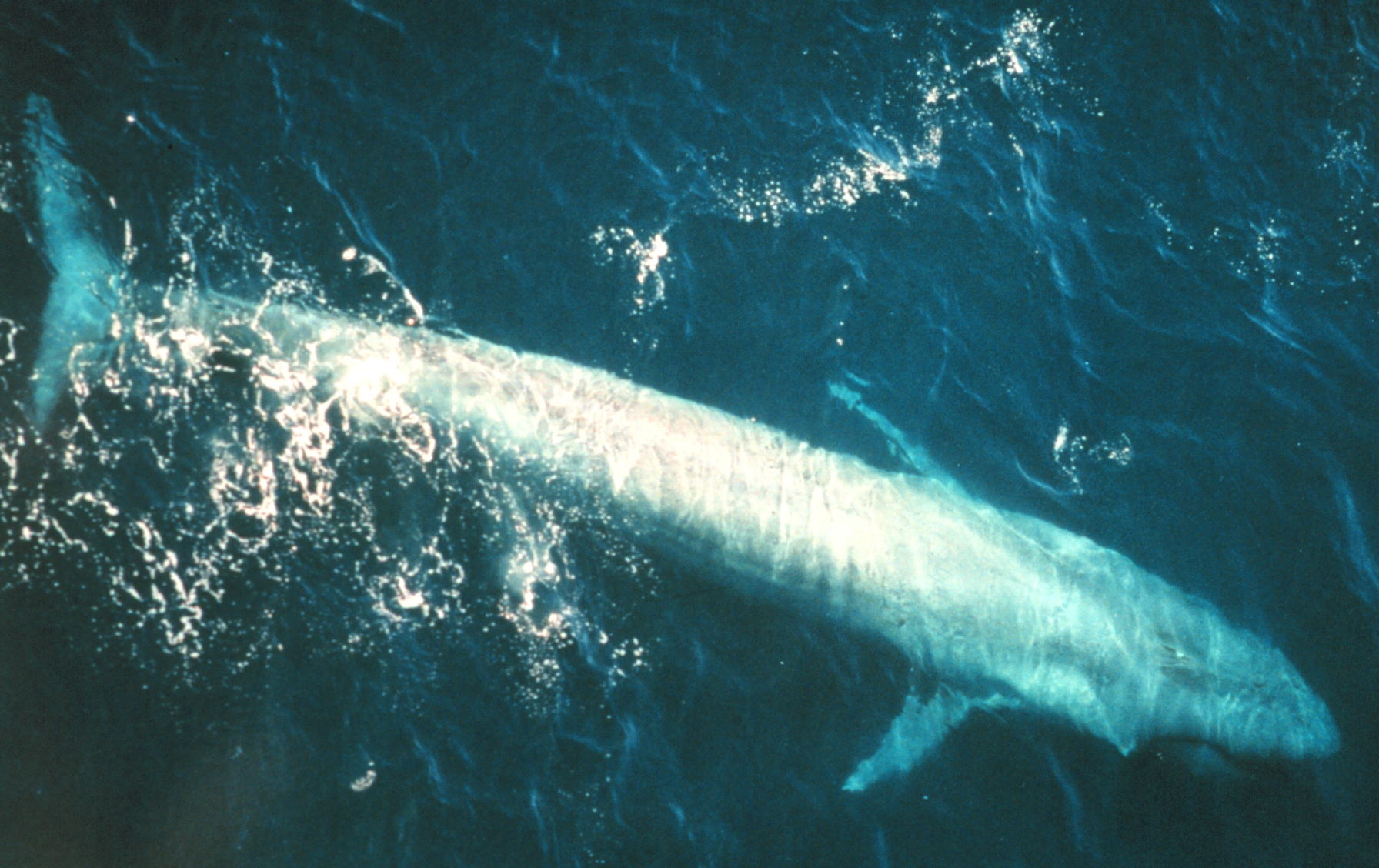
Blue whale

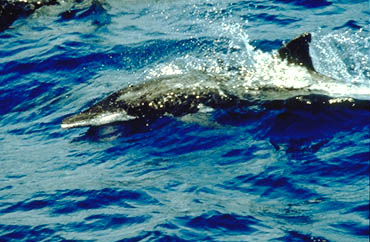
Rough-toothed dolphin

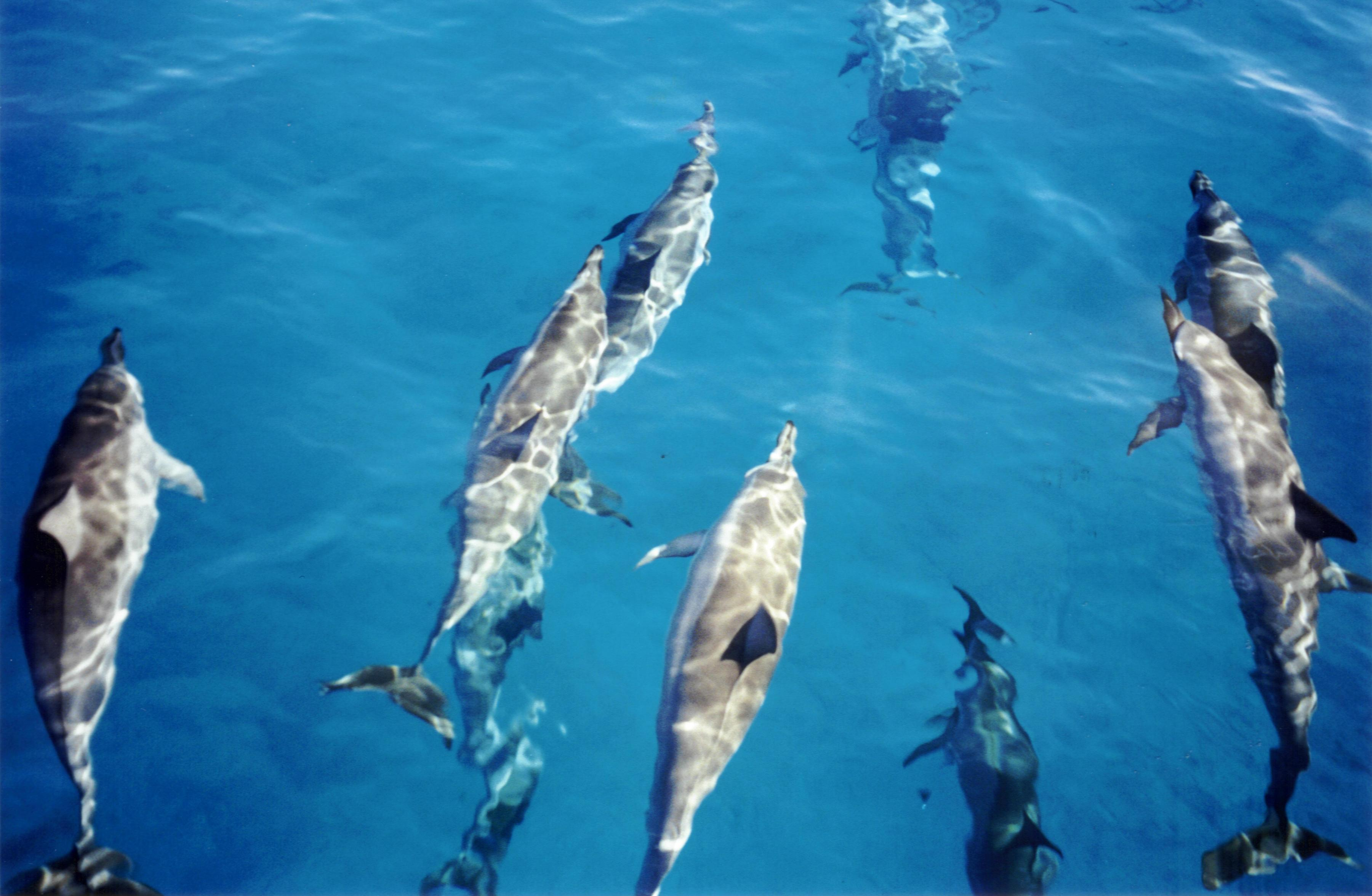
Spinner dolphins

The order Cetacea includes whales, dolphins and porpoises. They are the mammals most fully adapted to aquatic life with a spindle-shaped nearly hairless body, protected by a thick layer of blubber, and forelimbs and tail modified to provide propulsion underwater.

- Suborder: Mysticeti
  - Family: Balaenopteridae
    - Subfamily: Balaenopterinae
      - Genus: Balaenoptera
        - Common minke whale, Balaenoptera acutorostrata LC
        - Sei whale, Balaenoptera borealis EN
        - Bryde's whale, Balaenoptera edeni DD
        - Blue whale, Balaenoptera musculus EN
        - Fin whale, Balaenoptera physalus EN
    - Subfamily: Megapterinae
      - Genus: Megaptera
        - Humpback whale, Megaptera novaeangliae VU
- Suborder: Odontoceti
  - Superfamily: Platanistoidea
    - Family: Physeteridae
      - Genus: Physeter
        - Sperm whale, Physeter macrocephalus VU
    - Family: Kogiidae
      - Genus: Kogia
        - Pygmy sperm whale, K. breviceps DD
        - Dwarf sperm whale, Kogia sima
    - Family: Ziphidae
      - Subfamily: Hyperoodontinae
        - Genus: Indopacetus
          - Longman's beaked whale, Indopacetus pacificus DD
        - Genus: Ziphius
          - Cuvier's beaked whale, Ziphius cavirostris DD
        - Genus: Mesoplodon
          - Blainville's beaked whale, Mesoplodon densirostris DD
          - Ginkgo-toothed beaked whale, Mesoplodon ginkgodens DD
    - Family: Delphinidae (marine dolphins)
      - Genus: Steno
        - Rough-toothed dolphin, Steno bredanensis DD
      - Genus: Sousa
        - Indian humpback dolphin, Sousa plumbea DD
      - Genus: Tursiops
        - Indo-Pacific bottlenose dolphin, Tursiops aduncus DD
        - Common bottlenose dolphin, Tursiops truncatus DD
      - Genus: Stenella
        - Pantropical spotted dolphin, Stenella attenuata
        - Striped dolphin, Stenella coeruleoalba
        - Spinner dolphin, Stenella longirostris
      - Genus: Lagenodelphis
        - Fraser's dolphin, Lagenodelphis hosei DD
      - Genus: Grampus
        - Risso's dolphin, Grampus griseus DD
      - Genus: Feresa
        - Pygmy killer whale, Feresa attenuata DD
      - Genus: Pseudorca
        - False killer whale, Pseudorca crassidens
      - Genus: Orcinus
        - Orca, O. orca DD
      - Genus: Globicephala
        - Short-finned pilot whale, Globicephala macrorhynchus
      - Genus: Peponocephala
        - Melon-headed whale, Peponocephala electra DD

== Order: Carnivora (carnivorans) ==
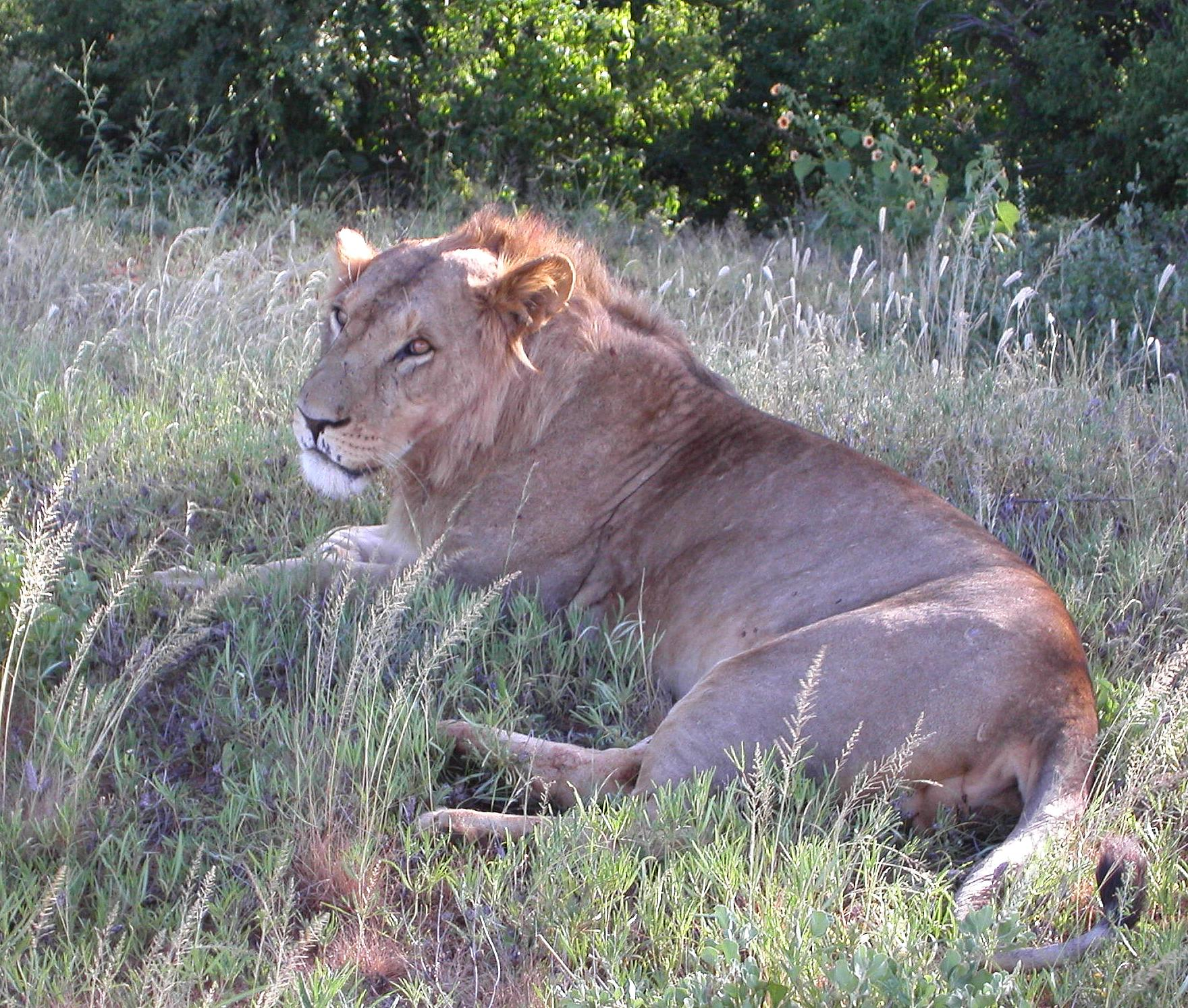
Lion in Samburu National Reserve

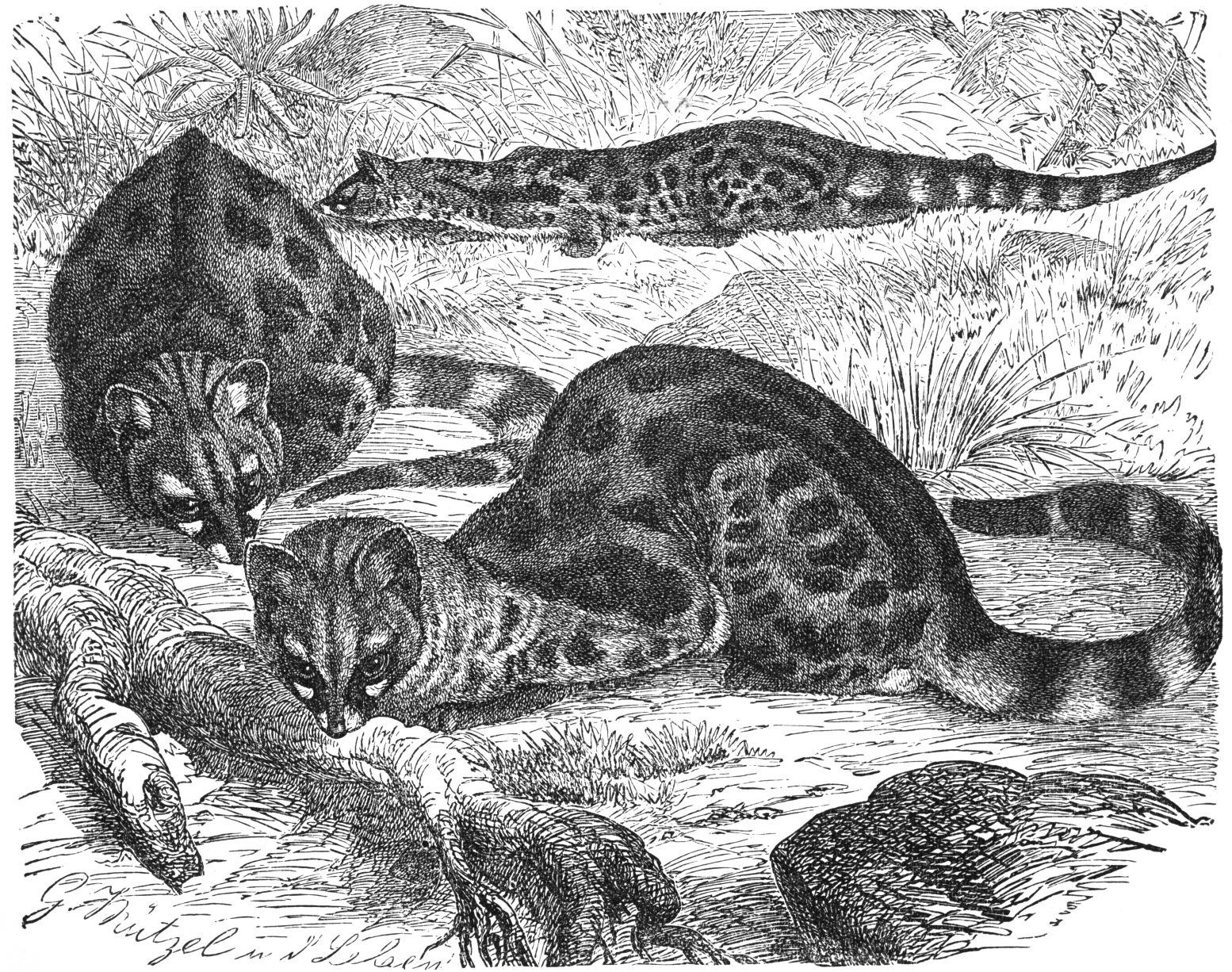
Common genet

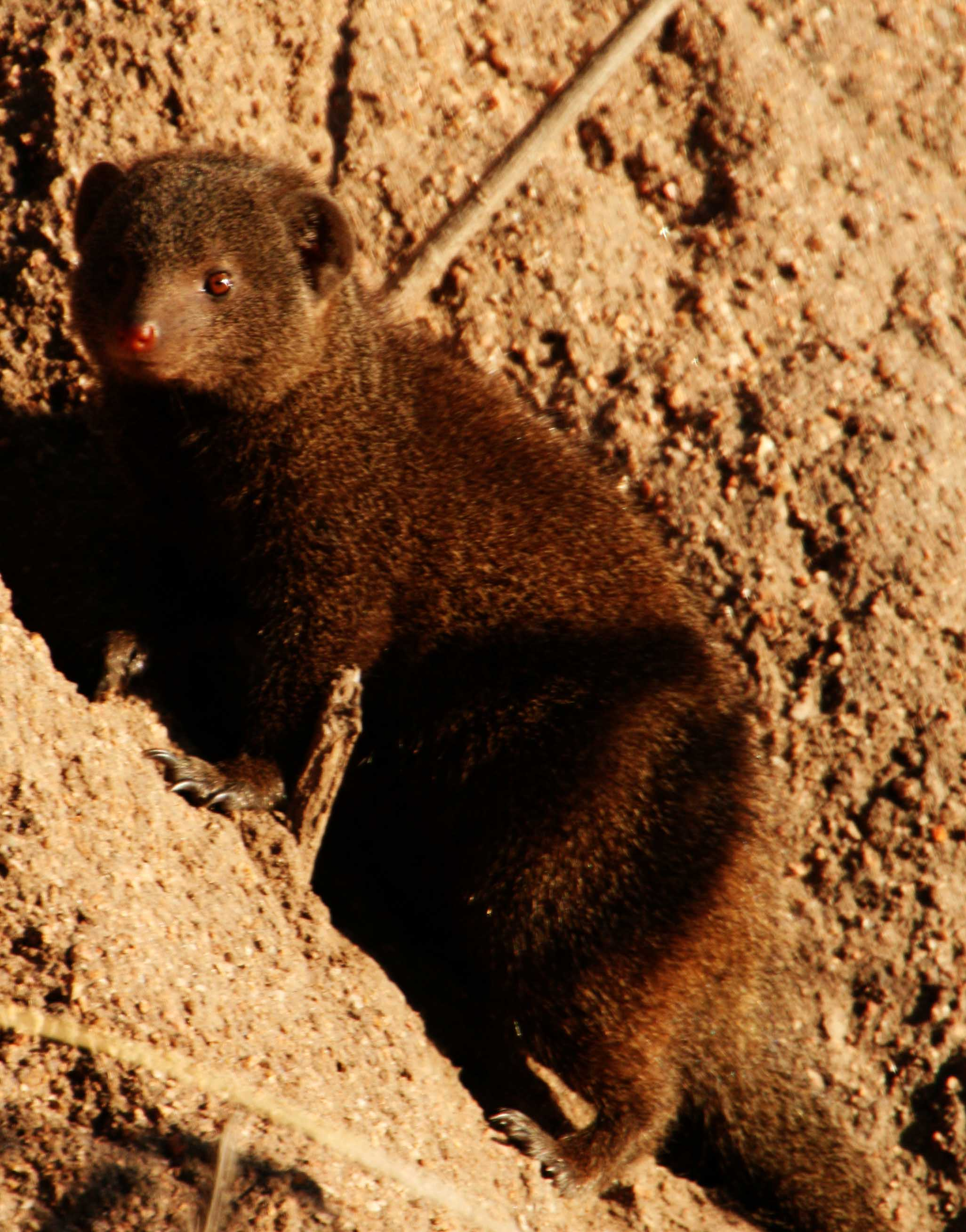
Common dwarf mongoose

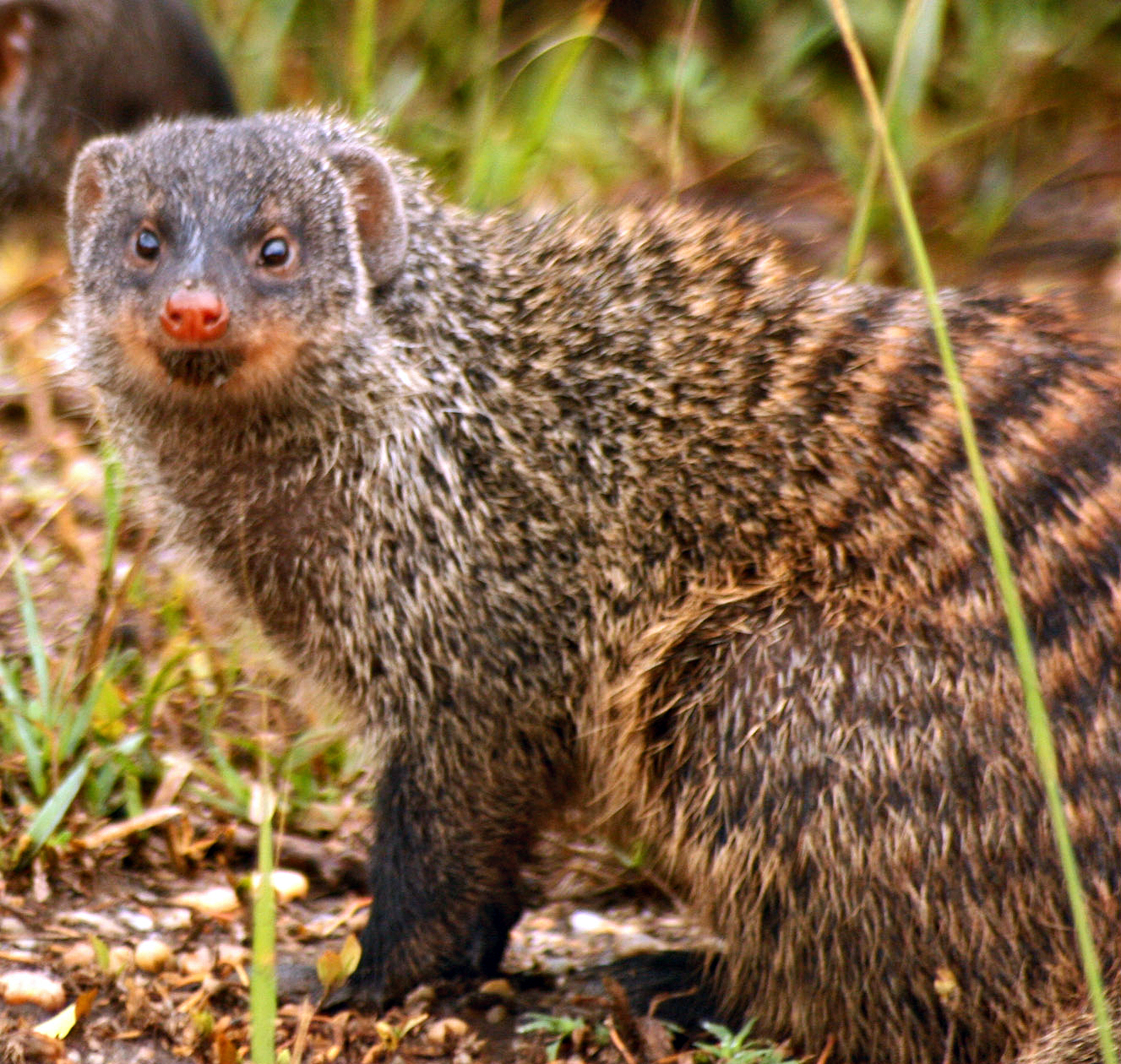
Banded mongoose

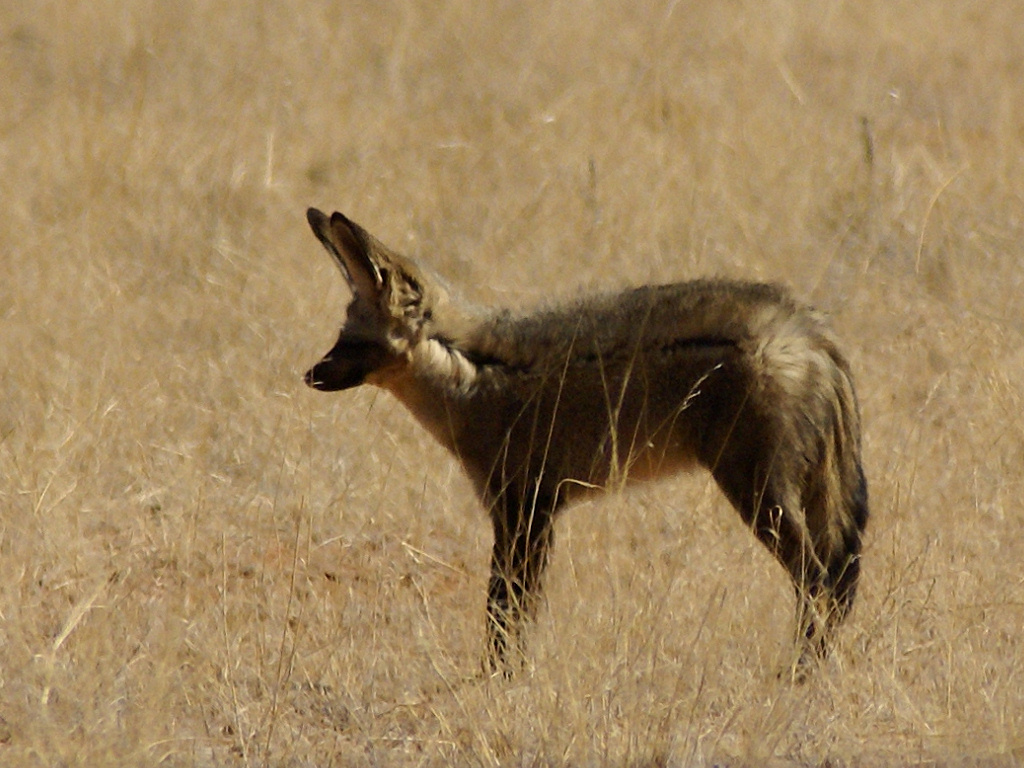
Bat-eared fox

There are over 260 species of carnivorans, the majority of which eat meat as their primary dietary item. They have a characteristic skull shape and dentition.

- Suborder: Feliformia
  - Family: Felidae (cats)
    - Subfamily: Felinae
      - Genus: Acinonyx
        - Cheetah, A. jubatus VU
          - Southeast African cheetah, A. j. jubatus
      - Genus: Caracal
        - Caracal, C. caracal LC
        - African golden cat, C. aurata VU presence uncertain
      - Genus: Felis
        - African wildcat, F. lybica LC
      - Genus: Leptailurus
        - Serval, L. serval LC
    - Subfamily: Pantherinae
      - Genus: Panthera
        - Lion, P. leo VU
          - P. l. melanochaita
        - Leopard, P. pardus VU
          - African leopard, Panthera pardus pardus
  - Family: Viverridae
    - Subfamily: Viverrinae
      - Genus: Civettictis
        - African civet, C. civetta LC
      - Genus: Genetta
        - Common genet, G. genetta LC
        - Rusty-spotted genet, G. maculata LC
        - Servaline genet, G. servalina LC
  - Family: Nandiniidae
    - Genus: Nandinia
      - African palm civet, N. binotata LC
  - Family: Herpestidae (mongooses)
    - Genus: Atilax
      - Marsh mongoose, A. paludinosus LC
    - Genus: Bdeogale
      - Bushy-tailed mongoose, B. crassicauda LC
      - Jackson's mongoose, B. jacksoni NT
    - Genus: Helogale
      - Ethiopian dwarf mongoose, H. hirtula LC
      - Common dwarf mongoose, H. parvula LC
    - Genus: Herpestes
      - Egyptian mongoose, H. ichneumon LC
      - Somalian slender mongoose, H. ochracheus LC
      - Common slender mongoose, H. sanguineus LC
    - Genus: Ichneumia
      - White-tailed mongoose, I. albicauda LC
    - Genus: Mungos
      - Banded mongoose, M. mungo LC
  - Family: Hyaenidae (hyaenas)
    - Genus: Crocuta
      - Spotted hyena, C. crocuta LC
    - Genus: Hyaena
      - Striped hyena, H. hyaena NT
    - Genus: Proteles
      - Aardwolf, P. cristata LC
- Suborder: Caniformia
  - Family: Canidae (dogs, foxes)
    - Genus: Canis
      - African golden wolf, C. lupaster LC
    - Genus: Lupulella
      - Side-striped jackal, L. adusta LC
      - Black-backed jackal, L. mesomelas LC
    - Genus: Otocyon
      - Bat-eared fox, O. megalotis LC
    - Genus: Lycaon
      - African wild dog, L. pictus EN
  - Family: Mustelidae (mustelids)
    - Genus: Ictonyx
      - Striped polecat, I. striatus LC
    - Genus: Poecilogale
      - African striped weasel, P. albinucha LC
    - Genus: Mellivora
      - Honey badger, M. capensis LC
    - Genus: Hydrictis
      - Speckle-throated otter, H. maculicollis NT
    - Genus: Aonyx
      - African clawless otter, A. capensis NT

== Order: Perissodactyla (odd-toed ungulates) ==
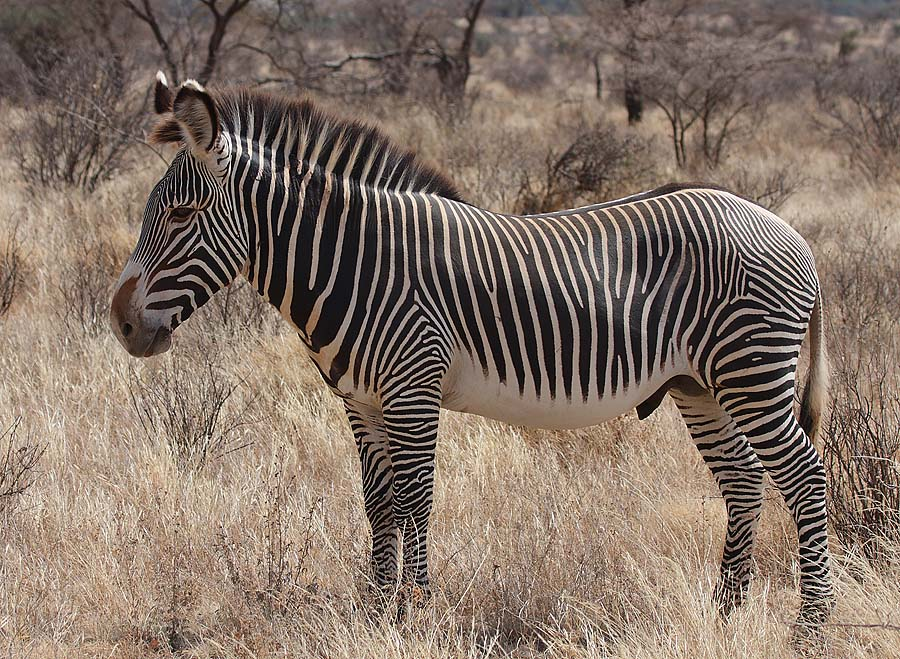
Grévy's zebra

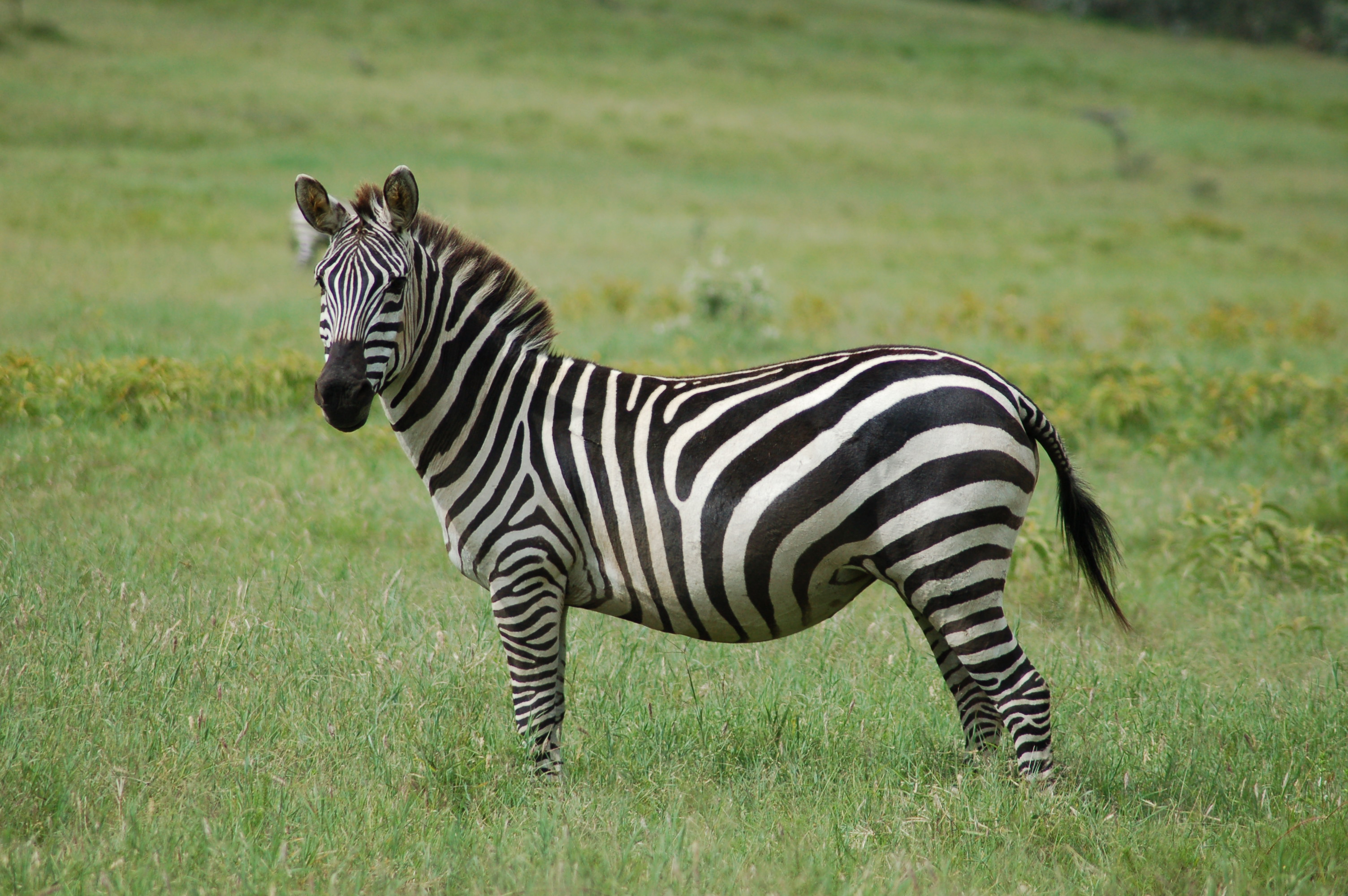
Grant's zebra

The odd-toed ungulates are browsing and grazing mammals. They are usually large to very large, and have relatively simple stomachs and a large middle toe.

- Family: Equidae (horses etc.)
  - Genus: Equus
    - Grevy's zebra, E. grevyi EN
    - Plains zebra, E. quagga NT
      - Grant's zebra, E. q. boehmi
      - Maneless zebra, E. q. borensis
- Family: Rhinocerotidae
  - Genus: Diceros
    - Black rhinoceros, D. bicornis CR
      - Uganda black rhinoceros, D. b. ladoensis
      - Eastern black rhinoceros, D. b. michaeli
  - Genus: Ceratotherium
    - White rhinoceros, C. simum
      - Southern white rhinoceros, C. s. simum NT reintroduced

== Order: Artiodactyla (even-toed ungulates) ==
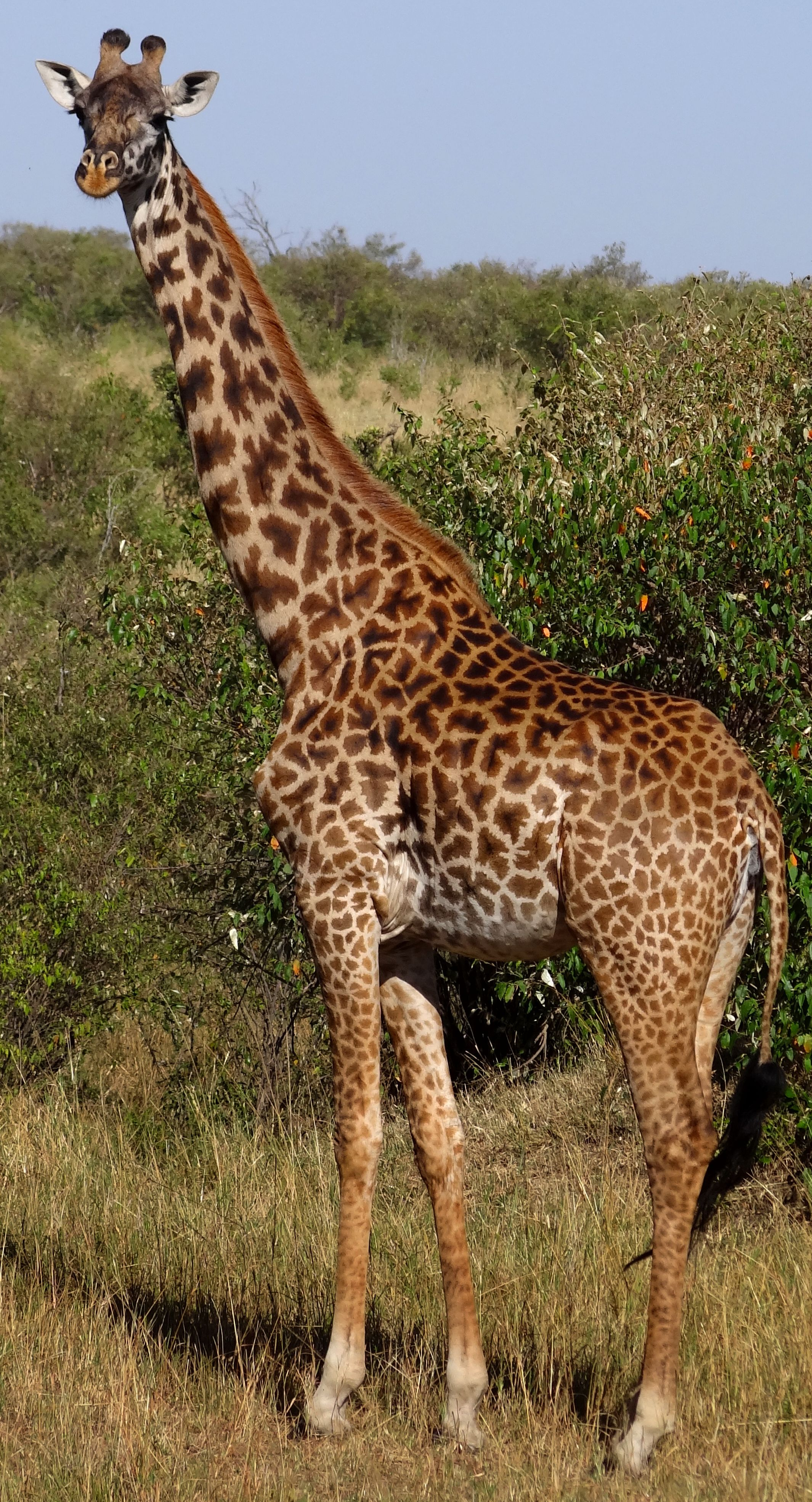
Masai giraffe

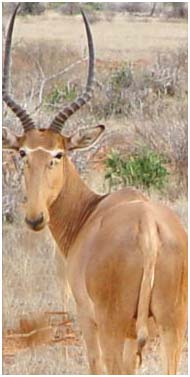
Hirola

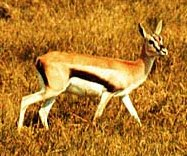
Thomson's gazelle

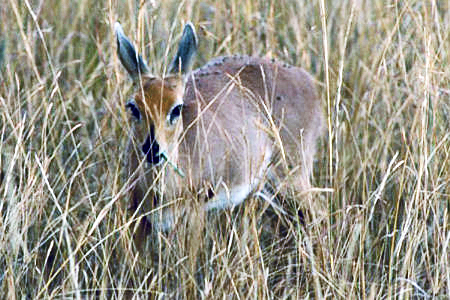
Oribi

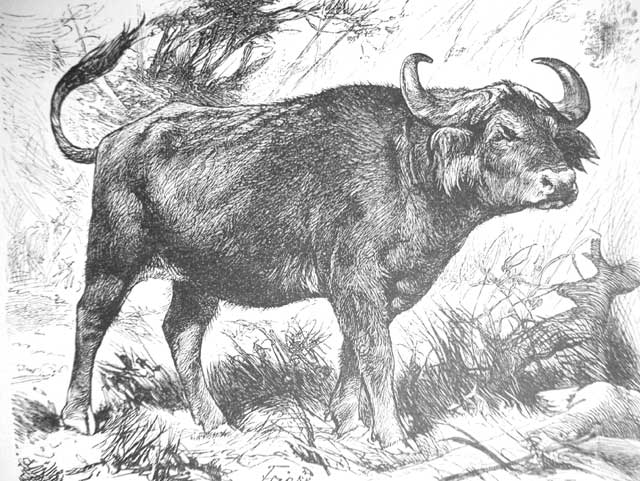
African buffalo

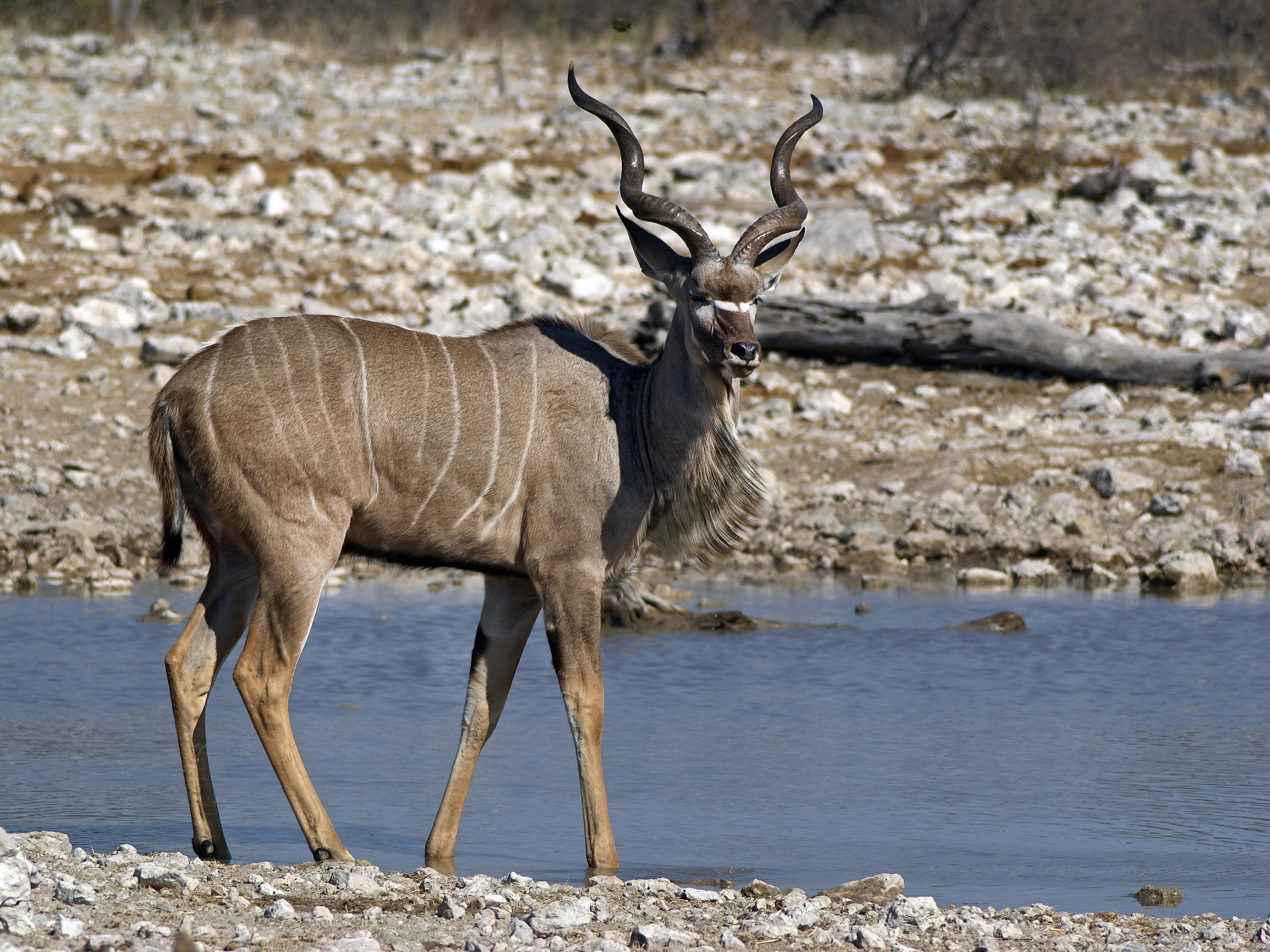
Greater kudu

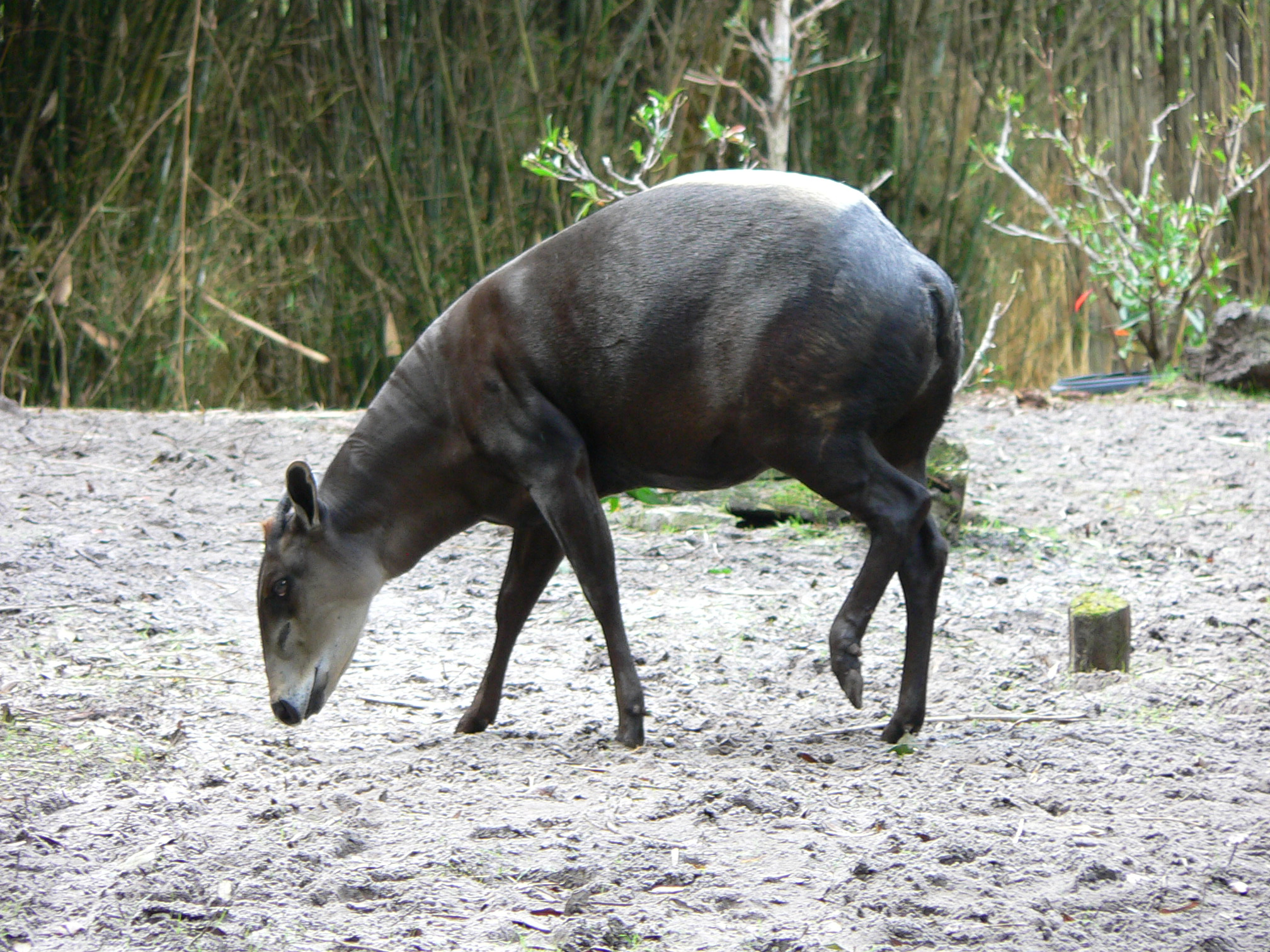
Yellow-backed duiker

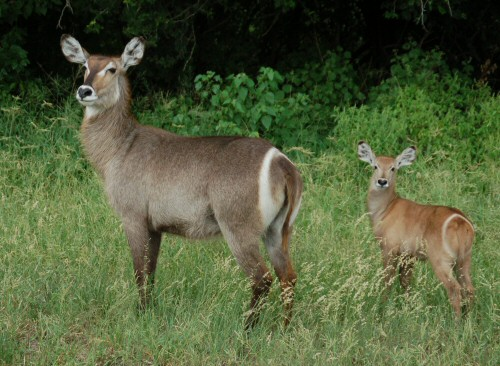
Waterbuck

The even-toed ungulates are ungulates whose weight is borne about equally by the third and fourth toes, rather than mostly or entirely by the third as in perissodactyls. There are about 220 artiodactyl species, including many that are of great economic importance to humans.

- Family: Suidae (pigs)
  - Subfamily: Phacochoerinae
    - Genus: Phacochoerus
      - Desert warthog, Phacochoerus aethiopicus
      - Common warthog, Phacochoerus africanus
  - Subfamily: Suinae
    - Genus: Hylochoerus
      - Giant forest hog, Hylochoerus meinertzhageni
    - Genus: Potamochoerus
      - Bushpig, Potamochoerus larvatus
- Family: Hippopotamidae (hippopotamuses)
  - Genus: Hippopotamus
    - Hippopotamus, Hippopotamus amphibius VU
- Family: Giraffidae (giraffe, okapi)
  - Genus: Giraffa
    - Nubian giraffe, Giraffa camelopardalis camelopardalis CR
    - Reticulated giraffe, Giraffa reticulata VU
    - Masai giraffe, Giraffa tippelskirchi VU
    - Rothschild's giraffe, Giraffa camelopardalis rothschildi EN
- Family: Bovidae (cattle, antelope, sheep, goats)
  - Subfamily: Alcelaphinae
    - Genus: Alcelaphus
      - Hartebeest, A. buselaphus LC
    - Genus: Connochaetes
      - Blue wildebeest, Connochaetes taurinus
    - Genus: Damaliscus
      - Topi, Damaliscus lunatus
    - Genus: Beatragus
      - Hirola, Beatragus hunteri CR
  - Subfamily: Antilopinae
    - Genus: Gazella
      - Grant's gazelle, Gazella granti
      - Soemmerring's gazelle, Gazella soemmerringii VU
      - Thomson's gazelle, Gazella thomsonii
    - Genus: Litocranius
      - Gerenuk, Litocranius walleri
    - Genus: Madoqua
      - Günther's dik-dik, Madoqua guentheri
      - Kirk's dik-dik, Madoqua kirkii
      - Salt's dik-dik, Madoqua saltiana
    - Genus: Neotragus
      - Suni, Neotragus moschatus
    - Genus: Oreotragus
      - Klipspringer, Oreotragus oreotragus
    - Genus: Ourebia
      - Oribi, Ourebia ourebi
    - Genus: Raphicerus
      - Steenbok, Raphicerus campestris
  - Subfamily: Bovinae
    - Genus: Syncerus
      - African buffalo, S. caffer NT
    - Genus: Tragelaphus
      - Bongo, Tragelaphus eurycerus
      - Lesser kudu, Tragelaphus imberbis
      - Common eland, Tragelaphus oryx
      - Bushbuck, Tragelaphus scriptus
      - Sitatunga, Tragelaphus spekii
      - Greater kudu, Tragelaphus strepsiceros
  - Subfamily: Cephalophinae
    - Genus: Cephalophus
      - Aders's duiker, Cephalophus adersi CR
      - Peters's duiker, Cephalophus callipygus
      - Harvey's duiker, Cephalophus harveyi
      - Blue duiker, Cephalophus monticola
      - Black-fronted duiker, Cephalophus nigrifrons
      - Yellow-backed duiker, Cephalophus silvicultor
      - Weyns's duiker, Cephalophus weynsi
    - Genus: Sylvicapra
      - Common duiker, Sylvicapra grimmia
  - Subfamily: Hippotraginae
    - Genus: Hippotragus
      - Roan antelope, Hippotragus equinus
      - Sable antelope, Hippotragus niger
    - Genus: Oryx
      - Common beisa oryx, Oryx beisa beisa
      - Fringe-eared oryx, Oryx beisa callotis VU
  - Subfamily: Aepycerotinae
    - Genus: Aepyceros
      - Impala, Aepyceros melampus
  - Subfamily: Reduncinae
    - Genus: Kobus
      - Waterbuck, Kobus ellipsiprymnus
      - Kob, Kobus kob
    - Genus: Redunca
      - Mountain reedbuck, Redunca fulvorufula LC
      - Bohor reedbuck, Redunca redunca

== See also ==
- List of chordate orders
- Lists of mammals by region
- List of prehistoric mammals
- Mammal classification
- List of mammals described in the 2000s
