= Anourosorex japonicus =

Anourosorex japonicus Temporal range: Late Pleistocene

Scientific classification
- Kingdom: Animalia
- Phylum: Chordata
- Class: Mammalia
- Infraclass: Placentalia
- Order: Eulipotyphla
- Family: Soricidae
- Genus: Anourosorex
- Species: †A. japonicus

Binomial name
- †Anourosorex japonicus Shikama & Hasegawa, 1958

Extinct species of shrew

Anourosorex japonicus, also known as the Japanese mole shrew, is an extinct species of shrew that was endemic to Japan during the Late Pleistocene.

No species of Anourosorex is currently present in Japan, although they are widespread throughout other parts of East Asia. Fossils indicate that the Japanese mole shrew went extinct on Honshu between 18,000 and 14,000 BP.
