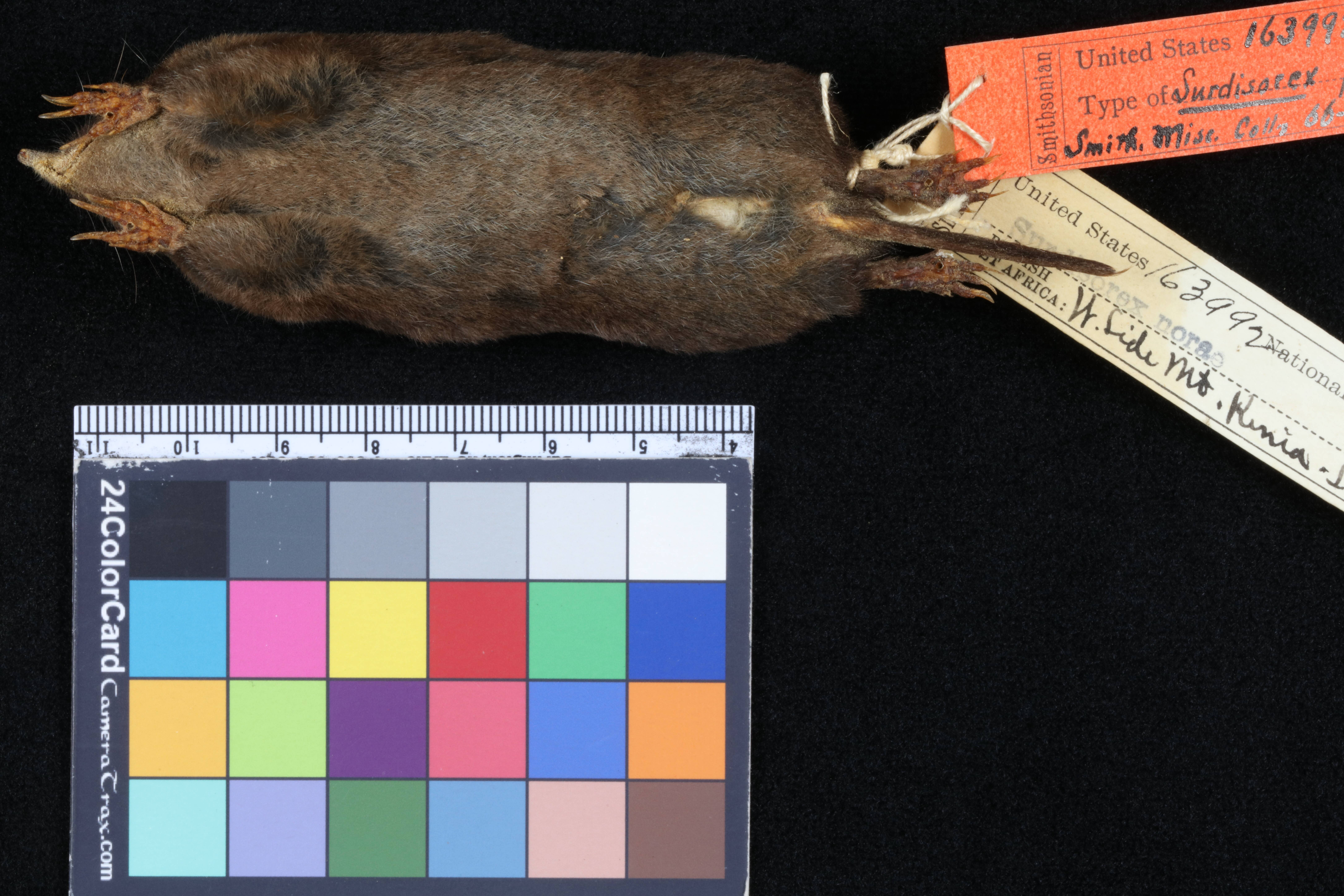

Conservation status
- Data Deficient (IUCN 3.1)

Scientific classification
- Kingdom: Animalia
- Phylum: Chordata
- Class: Mammalia
- Order: Eulipotyphla
- Family: Soricidae
- Genus: Surdisorex
- Species: S. polulus

Binomial name
- Surdisorex polulus Hollister, 1916
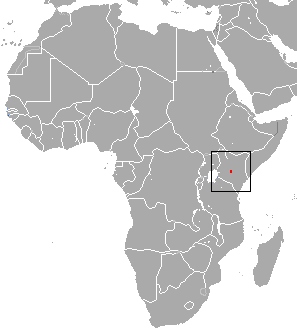
- Mount Kenya mole shrew range

= Mount Kenya mole shrew =

Species of mammal

The Mount Kenya mole shrew (Surdisorex polulus) is a species of mammal in the family Soricidae endemic to Mount Kenya in Kenya. Its natural habitat is tropical high-elevation bamboo and grassland, particularly the bamboo-belt of Mount Kenya and the adjacent heath and grassland.

The Mt. Kenya mole shrew is listed as vulnerable because it is known to only be found in a single location in highlands of Mount Kenya, though a closely related species, the Aberdare Mole Shrew, can be found on the nearby Aberdare range. The habitat of the species is dense montane grassland.
