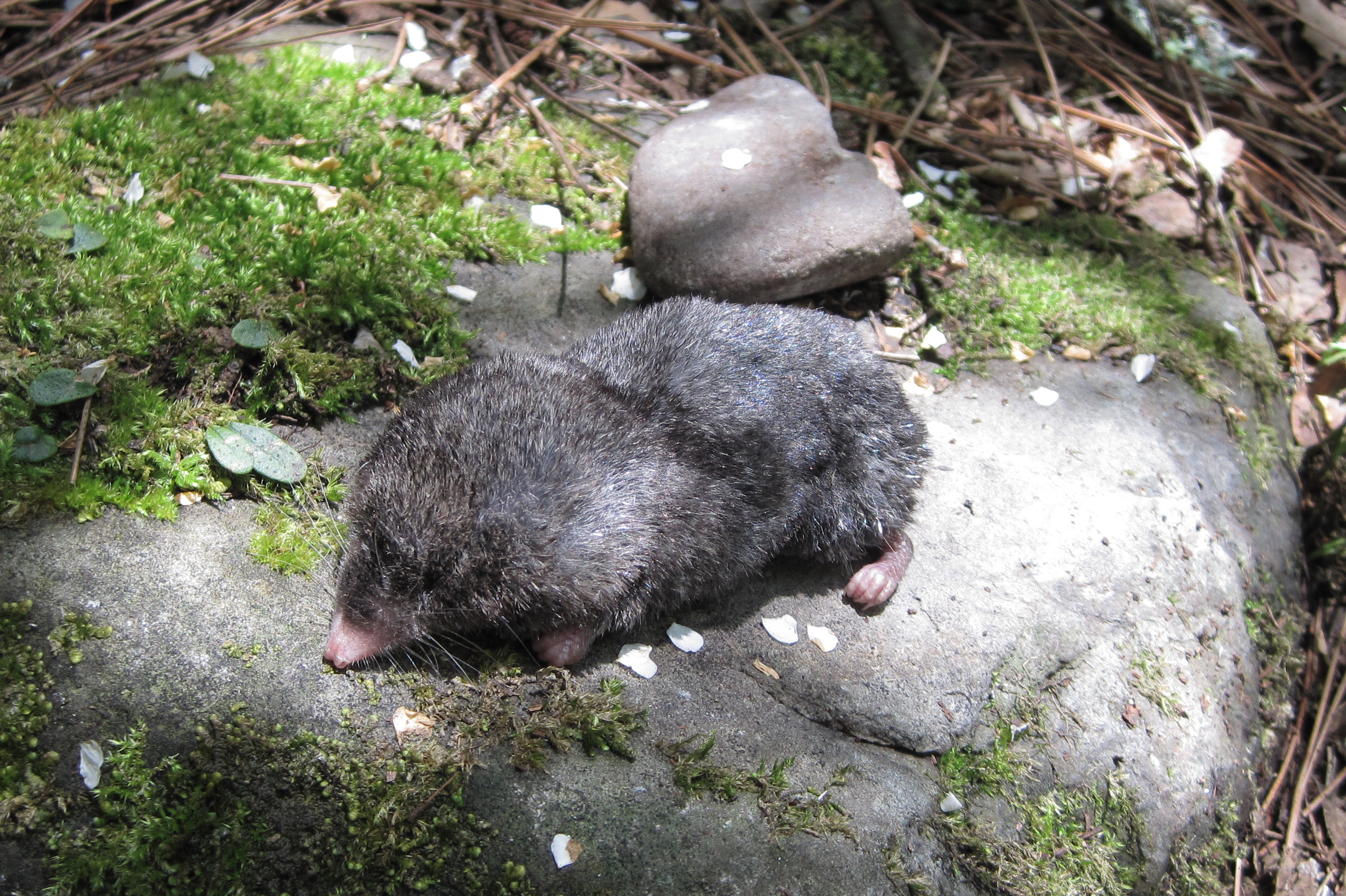

Conservation status
- Least Concern (IUCN 3.1)

Scientific classification
- Kingdom: Animalia
- Phylum: Chordata
- Class: Mammalia
- Order: Eulipotyphla
- Family: Soricidae
- Genus: Anourosorex
- Species: A. yamashinai

Binomial name
- Anourosorex yamashinai Kuroda, 1935
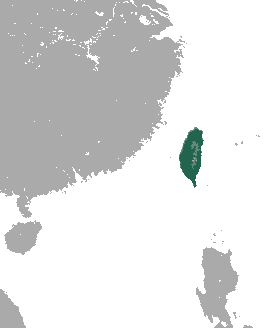
- Taiwanese mole shrew range

Synonyms
- Anourosorex squamipes yamashinai

= Taiwanese mole shrew =

Species of shrew

The Taiwanese mole shrew (Anourosorex yamashinai) is one of four species of red-toothed shrews in the genus Anourosorex. It is endemic to Taiwan.
