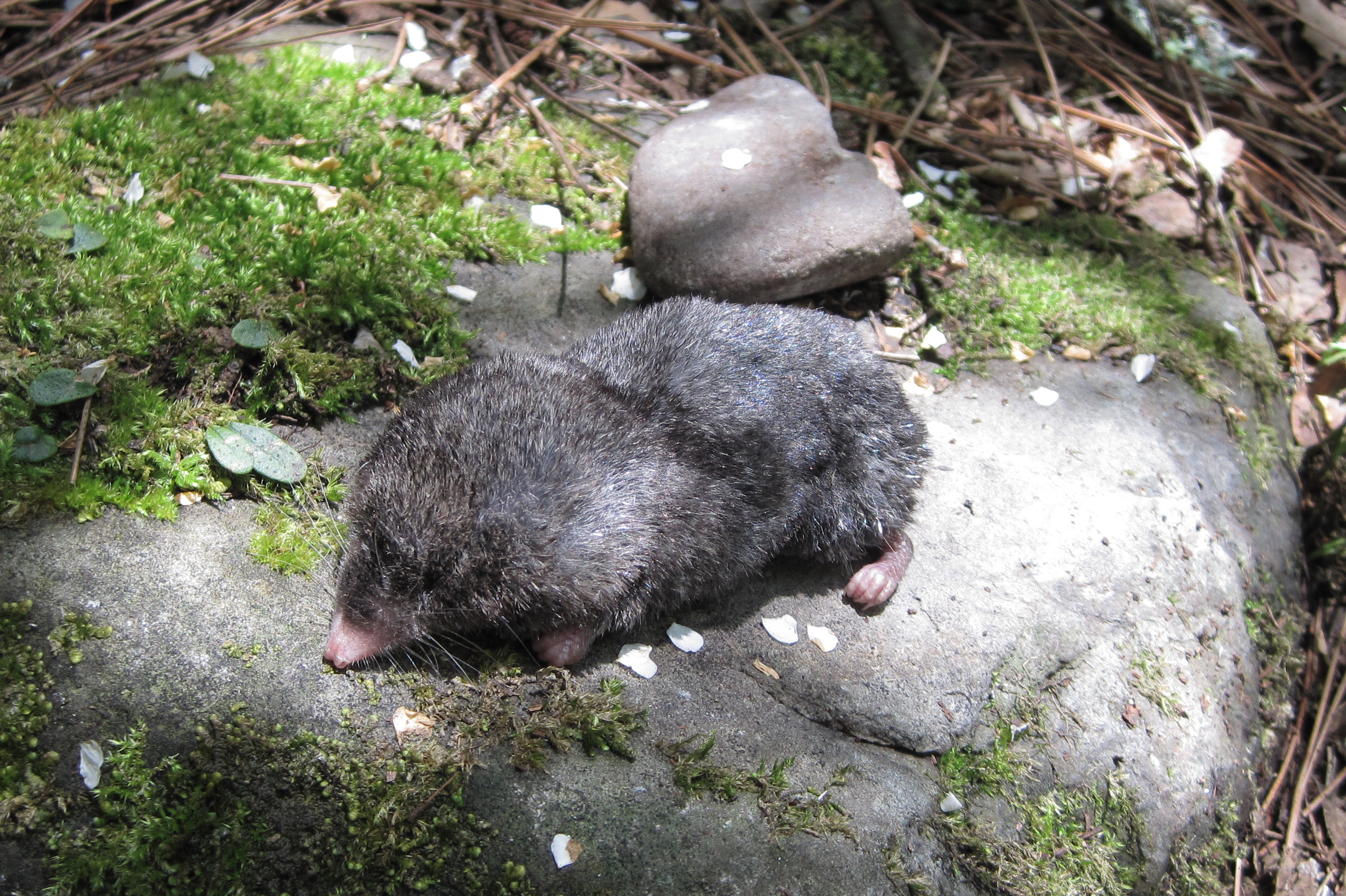

Conservation status
- Least Concern (IUCN 3.1)

Scientific classification
- Kingdom: Animalia
- Phylum: Chordata
- Class: Mammalia
- Order: Eulipotyphla
- Family: Soricidae
- Genus: Anourosorex
- Species: A. squamipes

Binomial name
- Anourosorex squamipes Milne-Edwards, 1872
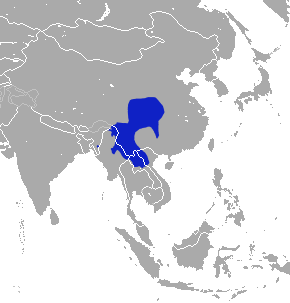
- Chinese mole shrew range

= Chinese mole shrew =

Species of mammal

The Chinese mole shrew (Anourosorex squamipes) is one of four species of Asian mole shrew in the genus Anourosorex.

Despite the name, it is found not only in China but also in northeast India, Myanmar, Thailand, and Vietnam. Like all other species of the genus Anourosorex, the Chinese mole shrew is fossorial, and is found in montane forests. In 2006, the Centers for Disease Control reported this species can carry a version of the hantavirus, which is genetically distinct from rodent hantavirus and new to science.
