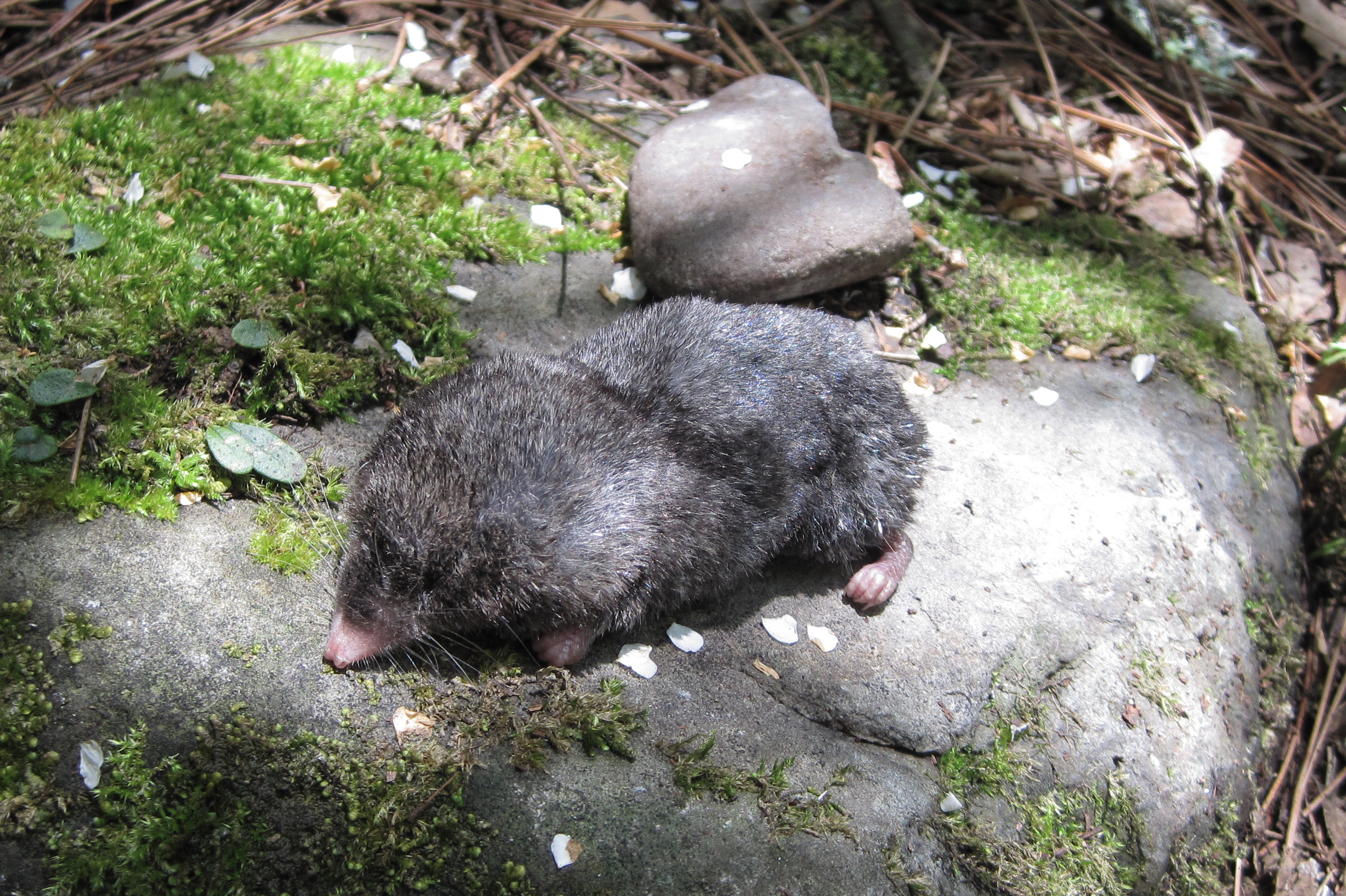
- Taiwanese mole shrew (Anourosorex yamashinai)

Scientific classification
- Domain: Eukaryota
- Kingdom: Animalia
- Phylum: Chordata
- Class: Mammalia
- Order: Eulipotyphla
- Family: Soricidae
- Subfamily: Soricinae
- Tribe: Anourosoricini; Anderson, 1879
- Genus: Anourosorex; Milne-Edwards, 1872

Type species
- Anourosorex squamipes

= Asian mole shrew =

Genus of mammals

Asian mole shrews (Anourosorex) are a genus of shrews that resemble moles, from China, Taiwan, India, and Indochina. They are the only known genus of the red-toothed shrew tribe Anourosoricini. The four known species are:

- Assam mole shrew (A. assamensis)
- Giant mole shrew (A. schmidi)
- Chinese mole shrew (A. squamipes)
- Taiwanese mole shrew (A. yamashinai)
- †Japanese mole shrew (A. japonicus)
