= Assam mole shrew =

Conservation status
- Least Concern (IUCN 3.1)

Scientific classification
- Kingdom: Animalia
- Phylum: Chordata
- Class: Mammalia
- Order: Eulipotyphla
- Family: Soricidae
- Genus: Anourosorex
- Species: A. assamensis

Binomial name
- Anourosorex assamensis Anderson, 1875
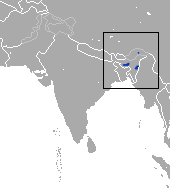
- Assam mole shrew range

Species of mammal

The Assam mole shrew (Anourosorex assamensis) is a species of red-toothed shrew endemic to northeast India.
