= Giant mole shrew =

Conservation status
- Data Deficient (IUCN 3.1)

Scientific classification
- Kingdom: Animalia
- Phylum: Chordata
- Class: Mammalia
- Order: Eulipotyphla
- Family: Soricidae
- Genus: Anourosorex
- Species: A. schmidi

Binomial name
- Anourosorex schmidi Petter, 1963
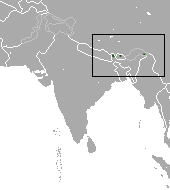
- Giant mole shrew range

Species of mammal

The giant mole shrew (Anourosorex schmidi) is a species of red-toothed shrew native to the southeastern slopes of the Himalaya of Bhutan and India.

It was listed as "Data Deficient" in both IUCN assessments (2008 and 2016).
