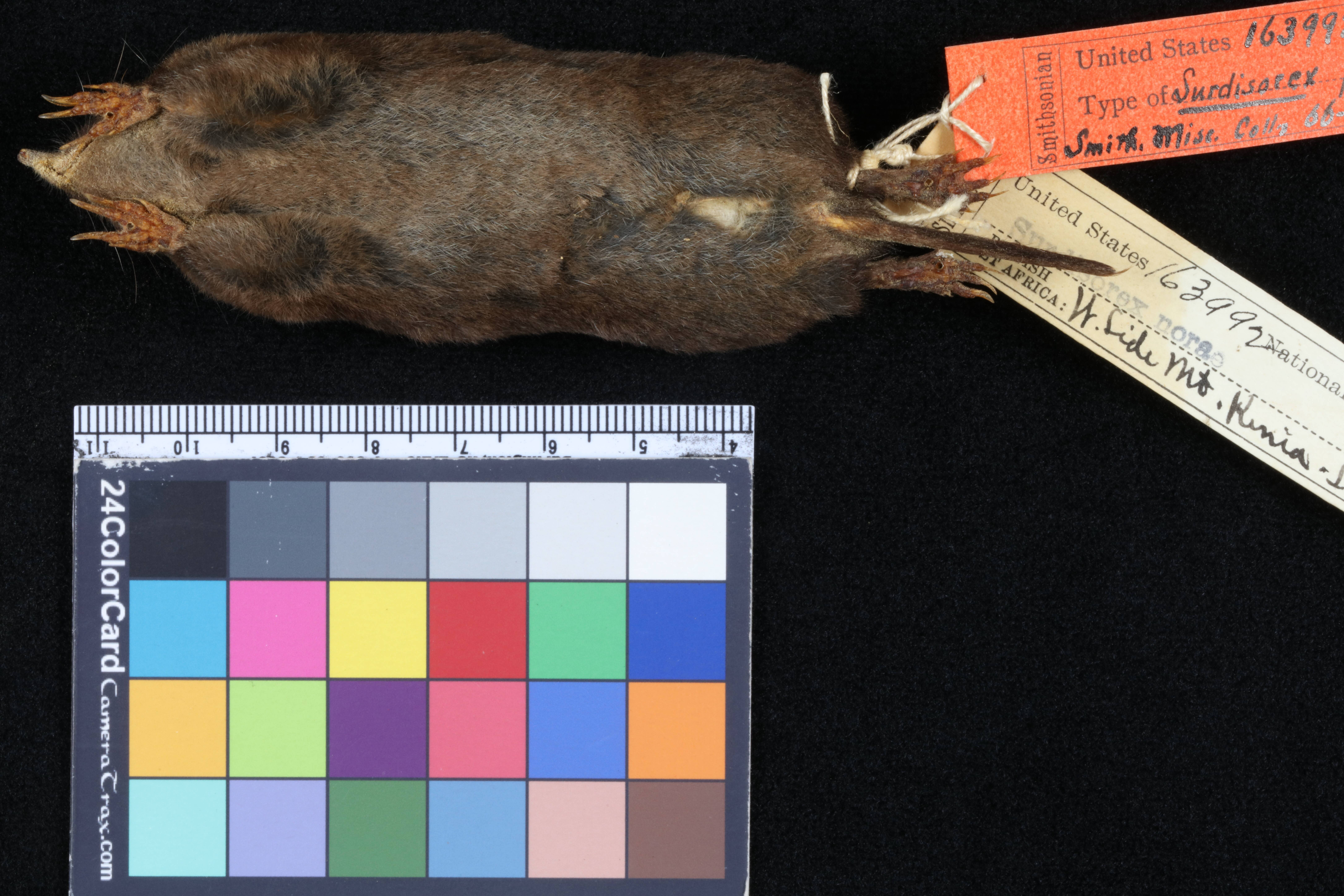
- Surdisorex polulus

Scientific classification
- Domain: Eukaryota
- Kingdom: Animalia
- Phylum: Chordata
- Class: Mammalia
- Order: Eulipotyphla
- Family: Soricidae
- Subfamily: Myosoricinae
- Genus: Surdisorex; Thomas, 1906

Type species
- Surdisorex norae Thomas, 1906

= Surdisorex =

Genus of mammals

Surdisorex is a genus of mammals in the family Soricidae. Surdisorex is one of three genera of African shrews, which, in turn, are one of three living subfamilies of shrews. Species in the genus Surdisorex are called African mole shrews because of their similarity to moles, to which they are not closely related.

The genus Surdisorex represents Kenya's only endemic genus of mammal. Prior to the description of the Mount Elgon mole shrew (Surdisorex schlitteri), the genus included two species from the highlands of central Kenya; the Aberdare mole shrew (S. norae) restricted to the Aberdare Range and the Mount Kenya mole shrew (S. polulus) restricted to Mount Kenya.

== Species ==
The three species, all found only in Kenya, are:

- Aberdare mole shrew (S. norae)
- Mount Kenya mole shrew (S. polulus)
- Mount Elgon mole shrew (S. schlitteri)
