= Aberdare mole shrew =

Conservation status
- Least Concern (IUCN 3.1)

Scientific classification
- Kingdom: Animalia
- Phylum: Chordata
- Class: Mammalia
- Order: Eulipotyphla
- Family: Soricidae
- Genus: Surdisorex
- Species: S. norae

Binomial name
- Surdisorex norae Thomas, 1906
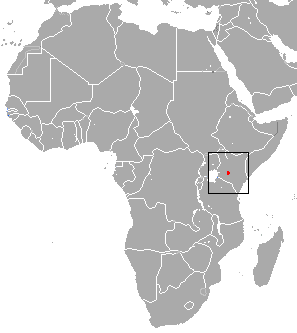
- Aberdare mole shrew range

Species of mammal

The Aberdare mole shrew (Surdisorex norae) is a species of mammal in the family Soricidae endemic to the Aberdare Mountains in Kenya. Its natural habitat is tropical high-elevation bamboo and grassland.
