= List of mammals of Croatia =

This list shows the IUCN Red List status of mammal species occurring in Croatia.

Icons which state each species' global IUCN status:
CR	Critically Endangered	In imminent risk of extinction in the wild
EN	Endangered	Facing an extremely high risk of extinction in the wild
VU	Vulnerable	Facing a high risk of extinction in the wild
NT	Near Threatened	Doesn't meet any criteria that would categorise it as risking extinction but likely to in the future
LC	Least Concern	No current identifiable risks to this species

== Order: Rodentia (rodents) ==
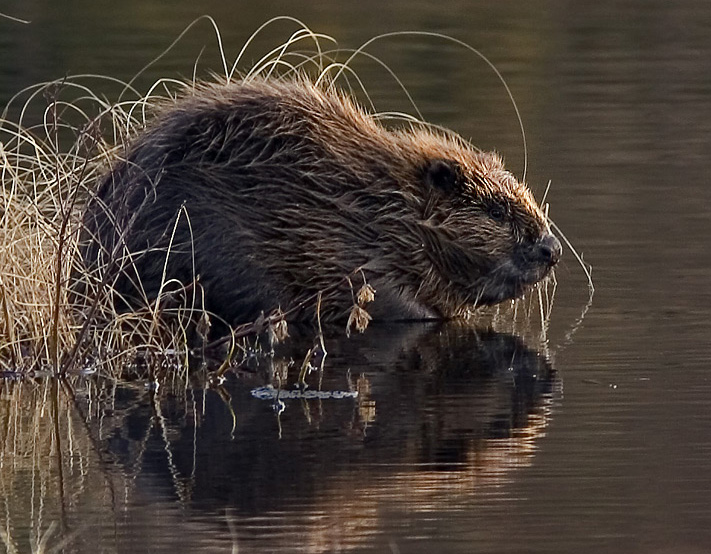
European beaver

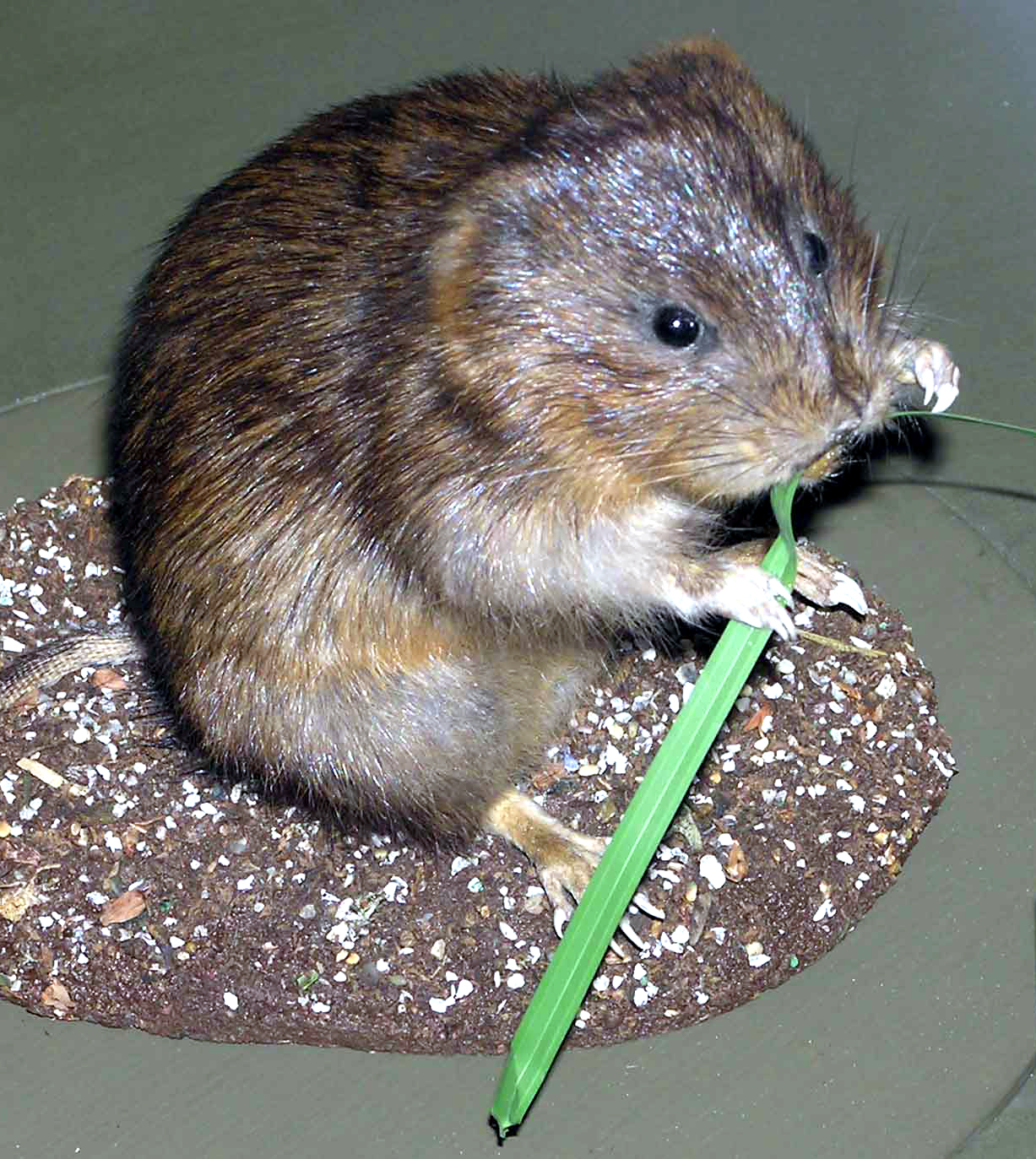
European water vole

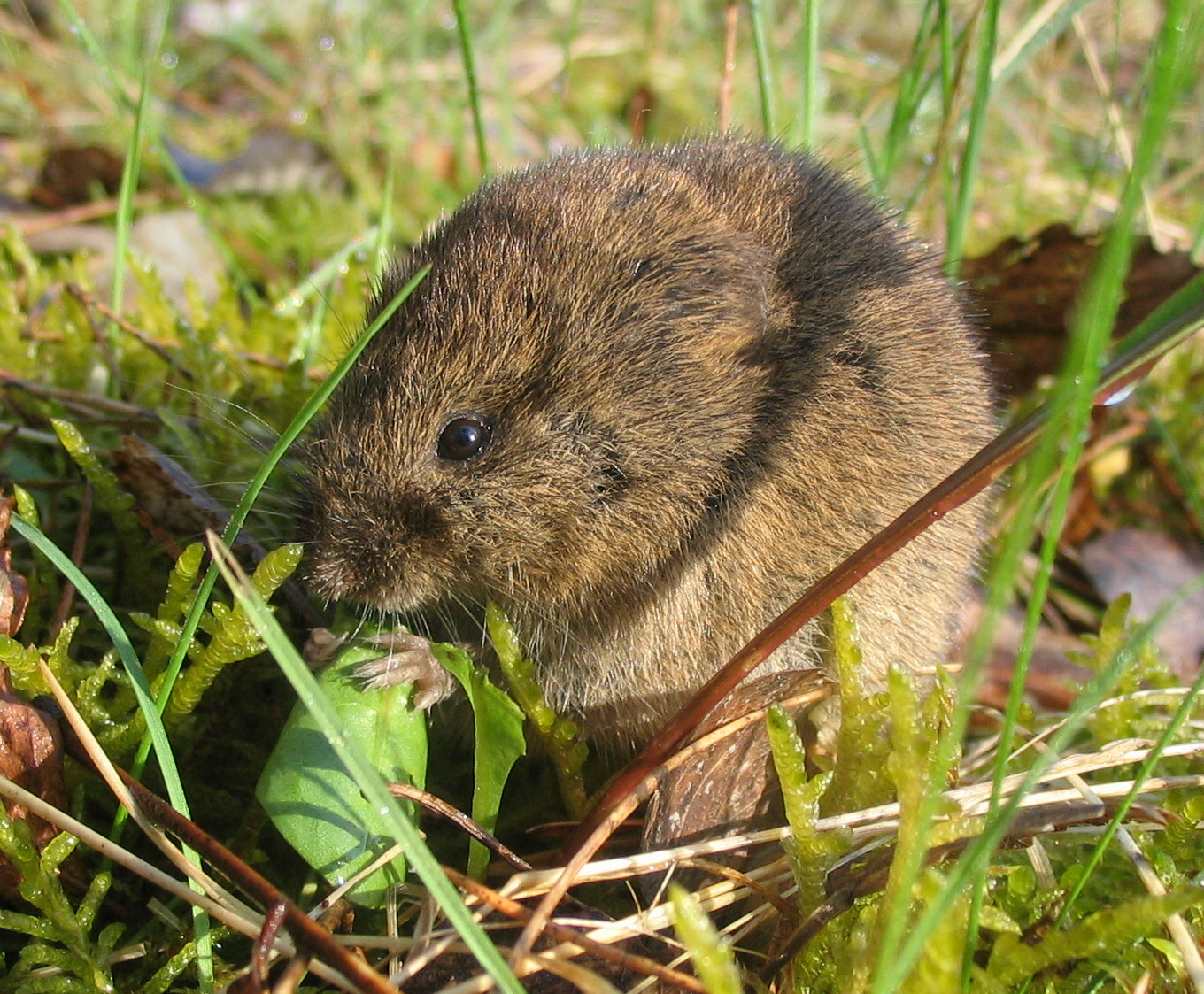
Common vole

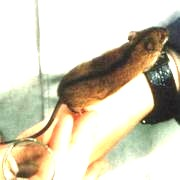
Striped field mouse

Rodents make up the largest order of mammals, with over 40% of mammalian species. They have two incisors in the upper and lower jaw which grow continually and must be kept short by gnawing. Most rodents are small though the capybara can weigh up to 45 kg (99 lb).

- Family: Castoridae (beavers)
  - Genus: Castor
    - Eurasian beaver, C. fiber LC
- Family: Echimyidae
  - Genus: Myocastor
    - Nutria, M. coypus LC introduced
- Family: Sciuridae (squirrels)
  - Subfamily: Sciurinae
    - Tribe: Sciurini
      - Genus: Sciurus
        - Red squirrel, S. vulgaris LC
  - Subfamily: Xerinae
    - Tribe: Marmotini
      - Genus: Marmota
        - Alpine marmot, M. marmota LC
      - Genus: Spermophilus
        - European ground squirrel, S. citellus EN extirpated
- Family: Gliridae (dormice)
  - Subfamily: Leithiinae
    - Genus: Dryomys
      - Forest dormouse, Dryomys nitedula LC
    - Genus: Eliomys
      - Garden dormouse, E. quercinus NT
    - Genus: Muscardinus
      - Hazel dormouse, Muscardinus avellanarius LC
  - Subfamily: Glirinae
    - Genus: Glis
      - European edible dormouse, G. glis LC
- Family: Cricetidae
  - Subfamily: Arvicolinae
    - Genus: Arvicola
      - European water vole, A. amphibius LC
    - Genus: Chionomys
      - Snow vole, Chionomys nivalis LC
    - Genus: Clethrionomys
      - Bank vole, Clethrionomys glareolus LC
  - Genus: Cricetus
    - European hamster, C. cricetus CR presence uncertain
    - Genus: Dinaromys
      - Balkan snow vole, Dinaromys bogdanovi VU
    - Genus: Microtus
      - Field vole, Microtus agrestis LC
      - Common vole, Microtus arvalis LC
      - European pine vole, Microtus subterraneus LC
- Family: Muridae (mice, rats, voles, gerbils, hamsters, etc.)
  - Subfamily: Murinae
    - Genus: Apodemus
      - Striped field mouse, Apodemus agrarius LC
      - Yellow-necked mouse, Apodemus flavicollis LC
      - Broad-toothed field mouse, Apodemus mystacinus LC
      - Wood mouse, Apodemus sylvaticus LC
      - Ural field mouse, Apodemus uralensis LC
    - Genus: Micromys
      - Eurasian harvest mouse, Micromys minutus LC
    - Genus: Mus
      - Steppe mouse, Mus spicilegus LC

== Order: Lagomorpha (lagomorphs) ==
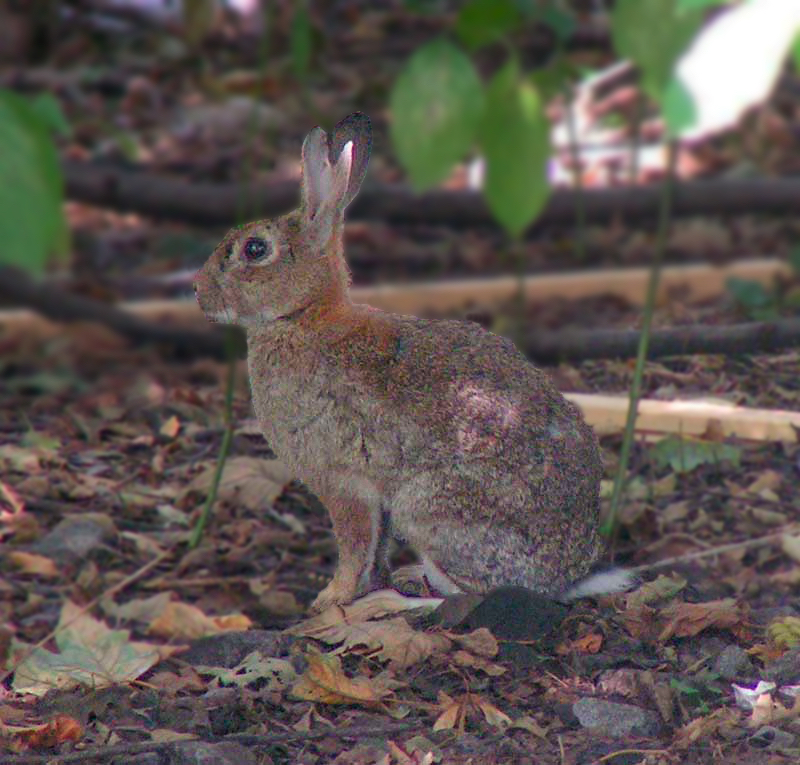
European rabbit

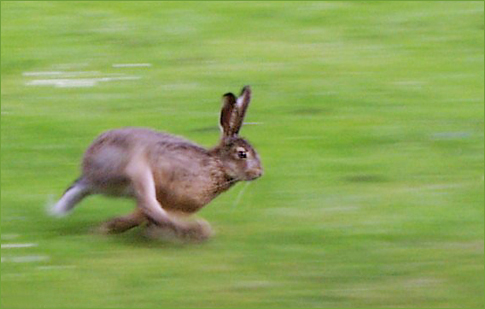
European hare

The lagomorphs comprise two families, Leporidae (hares and rabbits), and Ochotonidae (pikas). Though they can resemble rodents, and were classified as a superfamily in that order until the early 20th century, they have since been considered a separate order. They differ from rodents in a number of physical characteristics, such as having four incisors in the upper jaw rather than two.

- Family: Leporidae (rabbits, hares)
  - Genus: Lepus
    - European hare, L. europaeus LC
  - Genus: Oryctolagus
    - European rabbit, O. cuniculus NT introduced

== Order: Eulipotyphla (hedgehogs, shrews and moles) ==
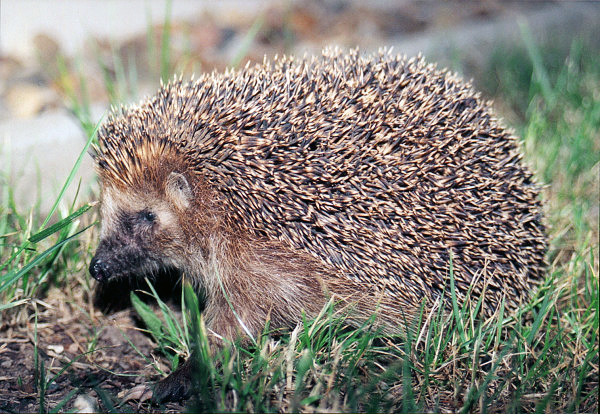
West European hedgehog

Hedgehogs are easily recognised by their spines, shrews closely resemble mice, and moles are stout-bodied burrowers.

- Family: Erinaceidae (hedgehogs)
  - Subfamily: Erinaceinae
    - Genus: Erinaceus
      - West European hedgehog, E. europaeus NT
- Family: Soricidae (shrews)
  - Subfamily: Crocidurinae
    - Genus: Crocidura
      - Bicolored shrew, C. leucodon LC
      - Lesser white-toothed shrew, C. suaveolens LC
  - Subfamily: Soricinae
    - Tribe: Nectogalini
      - Genus: Neomys
        - Southern water shrew, N. anomalus LC
        - Eurasian water shrew, N. fodiens LC
    - Tribe: Soricini
      - Genus: Sorex
        - Alpine shrew, S. alpinus NT
        - Common shrew, S. araneus LC

== Order: Chiroptera (bats) ==
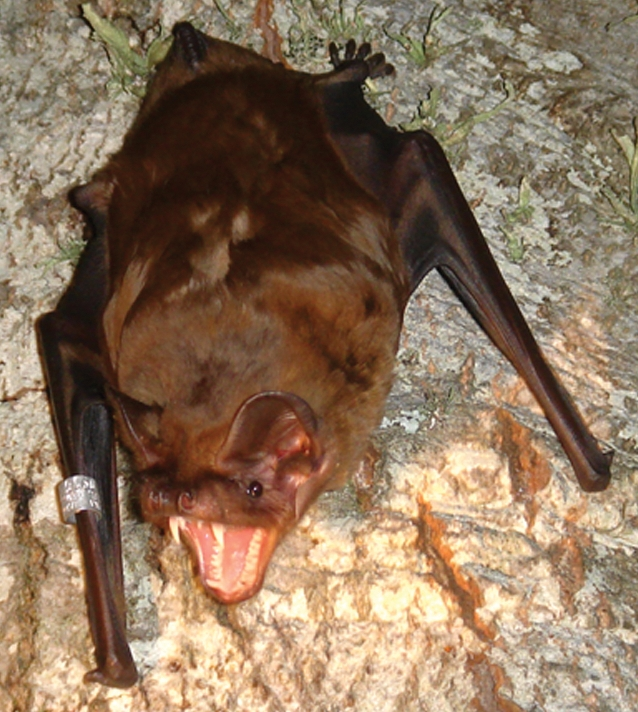
Greater noctule bat

The bats' most distinguishing feature is that their forelimbs are developed as wings, making them the only mammals capable of flight. Bat species account for about 20% of all mammals.

- Family: Vespertilionidae
  - Subfamily: Myotinae
    - Genus: Myotis
      - Bechstein's bat, M. bechsteini NT
      - Long-fingered bat, M. capaccinii VU
      - Geoffroy's bat, M. emarginatus LC
  - Subfamily: Vespertilioninae
    - Genus: Barbastella
      - Western barbastelle, B. barbastellus NT
    - Genus: Nyctalus
      - Greater noctule bat, Nyctalus lasiopterus VU
      - Lesser noctule, Nyctalus leisleri LC
  - Subfamily: Miniopterinae
    - Genus: Miniopterus
      - Common bent-wing bat, M. schreibersii VU
- Family: Rhinolophidae
  - Subfamily: Rhinolophinae
    - Genus: Rhinolophus
      - Mediterranean horseshoe bat, R. euryale NT
      - Greater horseshoe bat, R. ferrumequinum LC
      - Lesser horseshoe bat, R. hipposideros LC
      - Mehely's horseshoe bat, R. mehelyi VU

== Order: Cetacea (whales) ==
The order Cetacea includes whales, dolphins and porpoises. They are the mammals most fully adapted to aquatic life with a spindle-shaped nearly hairless body, protected by a thick layer of blubber, and forelimbs and tail modified to provide propulsion underwater.

- Suborder: Mysticeti
  - Family: Balaenopteridae
    - Genus: Balaenoptera (rorquals)
      - Common minke whale, B. acutorostrata LC
      - Fin whale, B. physalus VU
- Subfamily: Megapterinae
  - Genus: Megaptera
    - Humpback whale, Megaptera novaeangliae LC
- Suborder: Odontoceti
  - Family: Physeteridae (sperm whales)
    - Genus: Physeter
      - Sperm whale, Physeter macrocephalus VU
  - Superfamily: Platanistoidea
    - Family: Delphinidae (marine dolphins)
      - Genus: Tursiops
        - Common bottlenose dolphin, Tursiops truncatus LC
      - Genus: Stenella
        - Striped dolphin, Stenella coeruleoalba LC
      - Genus: Delphinus
        - Short-beaked common dolphin, Delphinus delphis LC
      - Genus: Grampus
        - Risso's dolphin, Grampus griseus LC

== Order: Carnivora (carnivorans) ==
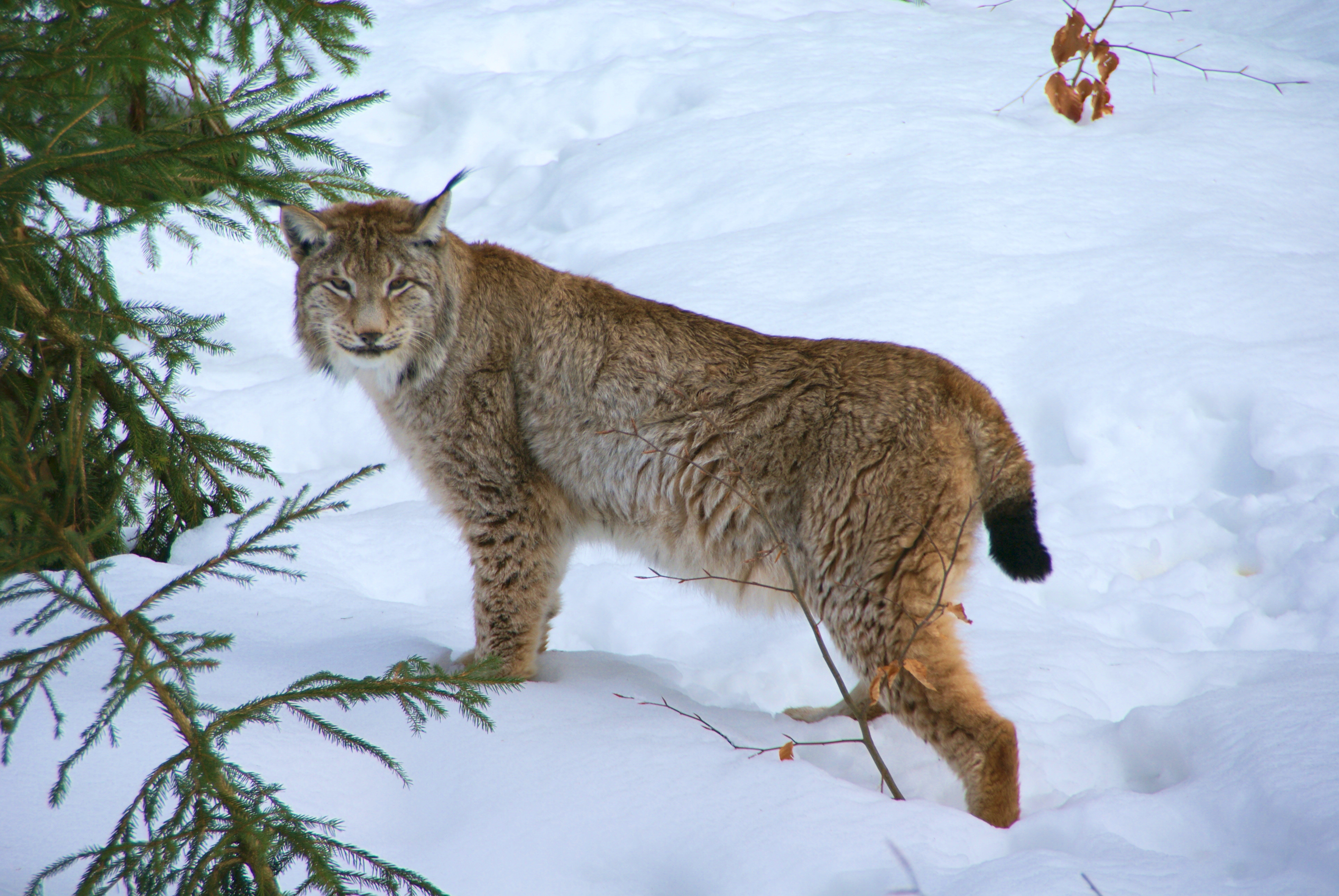
Eurasian lynx

European jackal (Canis aureus moreotica), a subspecies of golden jackal

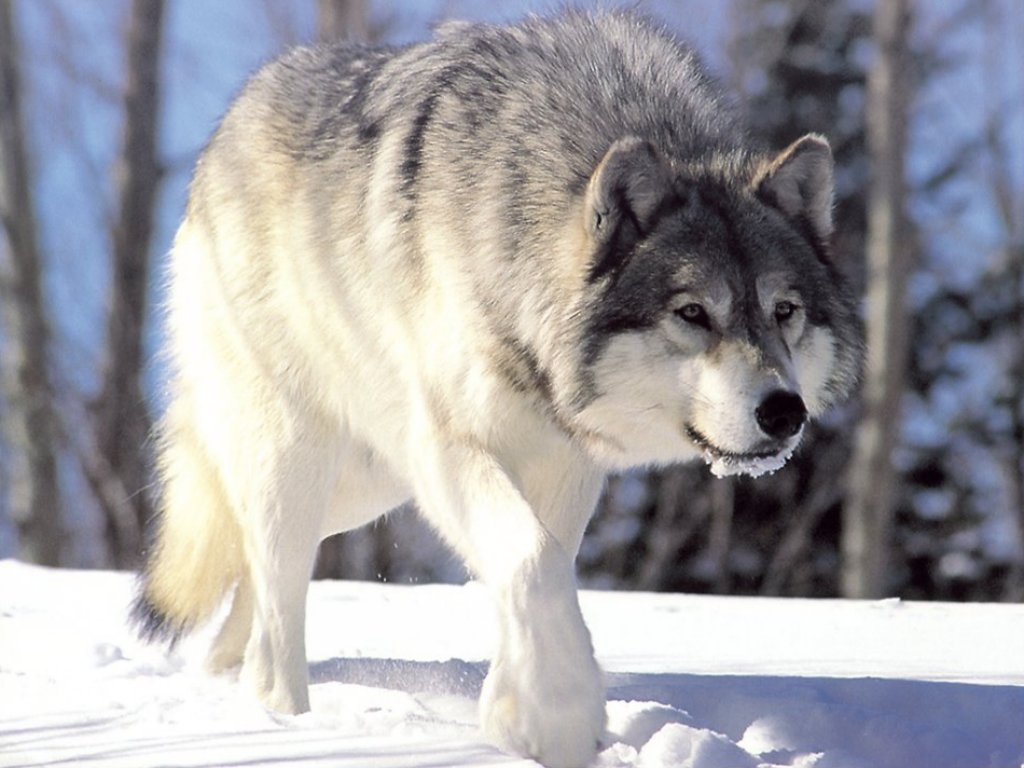
Gray wolf

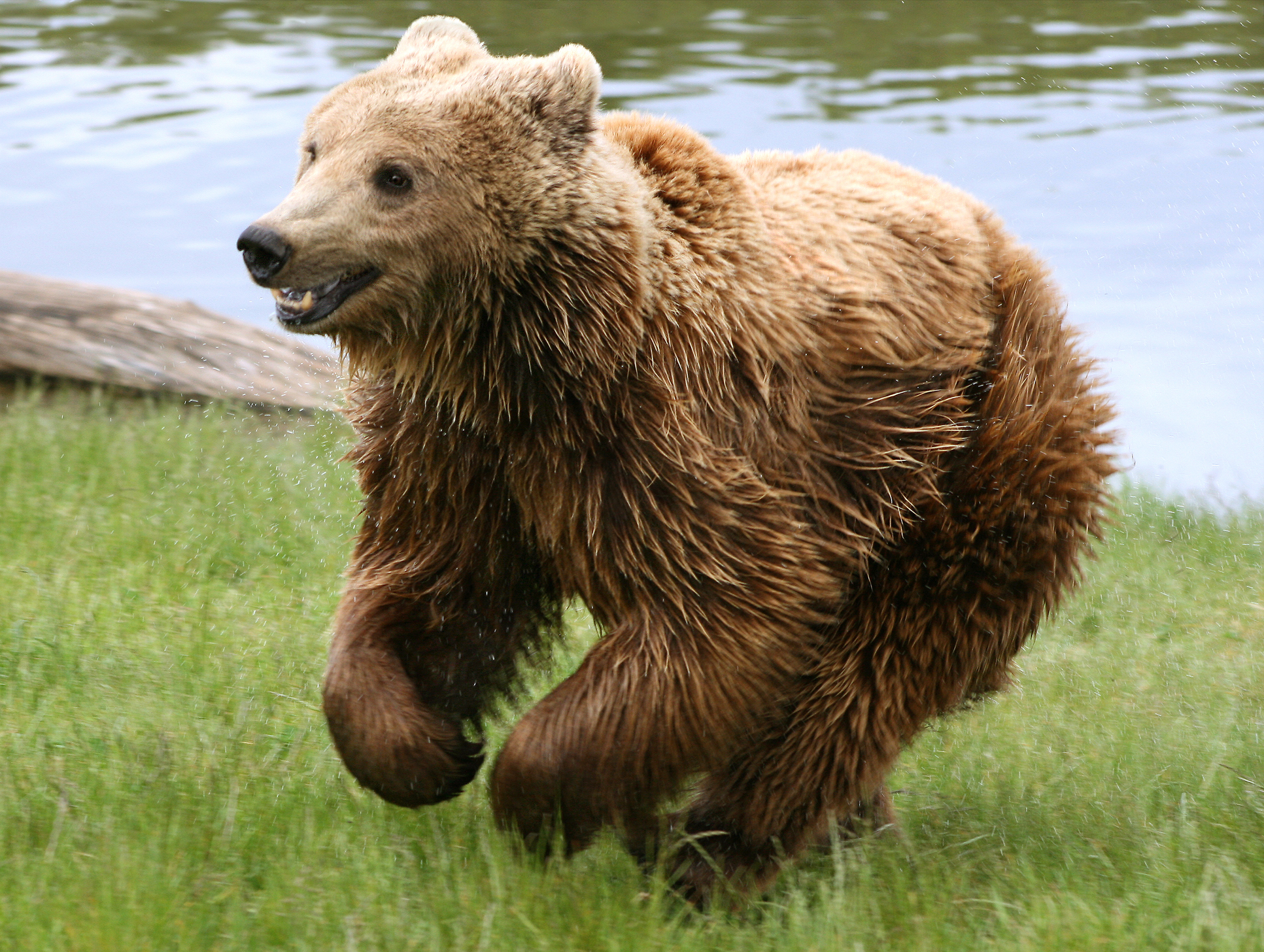
Young Eurasian brown bear

There are over 260 species of carnivorans, the majority of which eat meat as their primary dietary item. They have a characteristic skull shape and dentition.

- Suborder: Feliformia
  - Family: Felidae (cats)
    - Subfamily: Felinae
      - Genus: Felis
        - European wildcat, F. silvestris LC
      - Genus: Lynx
        - Eurasian lynx, L. lynx LC
  - Family: Herpestidae
    - Genus: Urva
      - Small Indian mongoose, U. auropunctata LC introduced
- Suborder: Caniformia
  - Family: Canidae (dogs, foxes)
    - Genus: Canis
      - Golden jackal, C. aureus LC
      - Gray wolf, C. lupus LC
    - Genus: Nyctereutes
      - Raccoon dog, N. procyonoides LC introduced
    - Genus: Vulpes
      - Red fox, V. vulpes LC
    - Genus: Procyon
      - Raccoon, P. lotor LC introduced
  - Family: Ursidae (bears)
    - Genus: Ursus
      - Brown bear, U. arctos LC
  - Family: Mustelidae (mustelids)
    - Genus: Lutra
      - European otter, L. lutra NT
    - Genus: Martes
      - Beech marten, M. foina LC
      - European pine marten, M. martes
    - Genus: Meles
      - European badger, M. meles LC
    - Genus: Mustela
      - Stoat, M. erminea LC
      - European mink, M. lutreola CR extirpated
      - Least weasel, M. nivalis LC
      - European polecat, M. putorius LC
  - Family: Phocidae (earless seals)
    - Genus: Monachus
      - Mediterranean monk seal, M. monachus VU

== Order: Artiodactyla (even-toed ungulates) ==
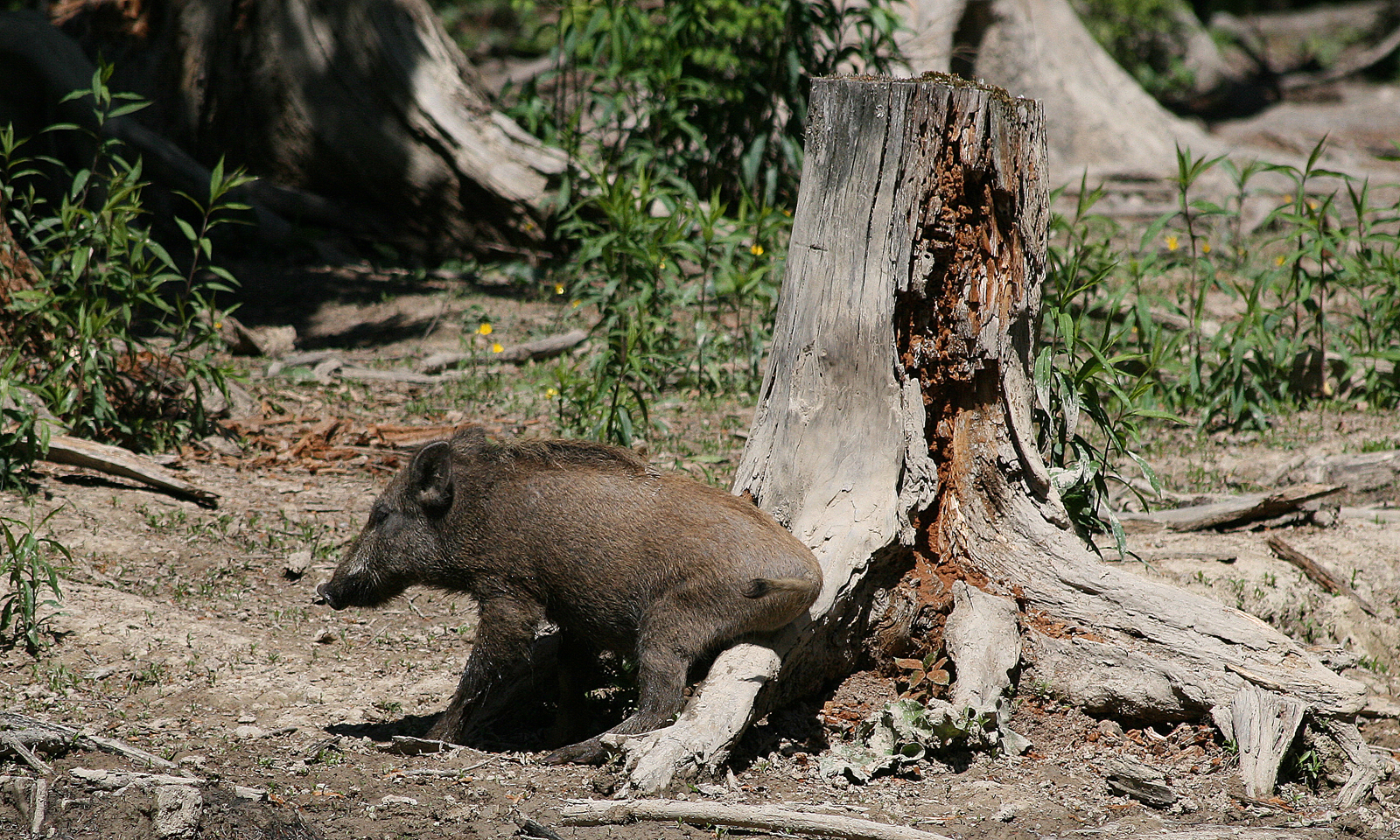
Boar

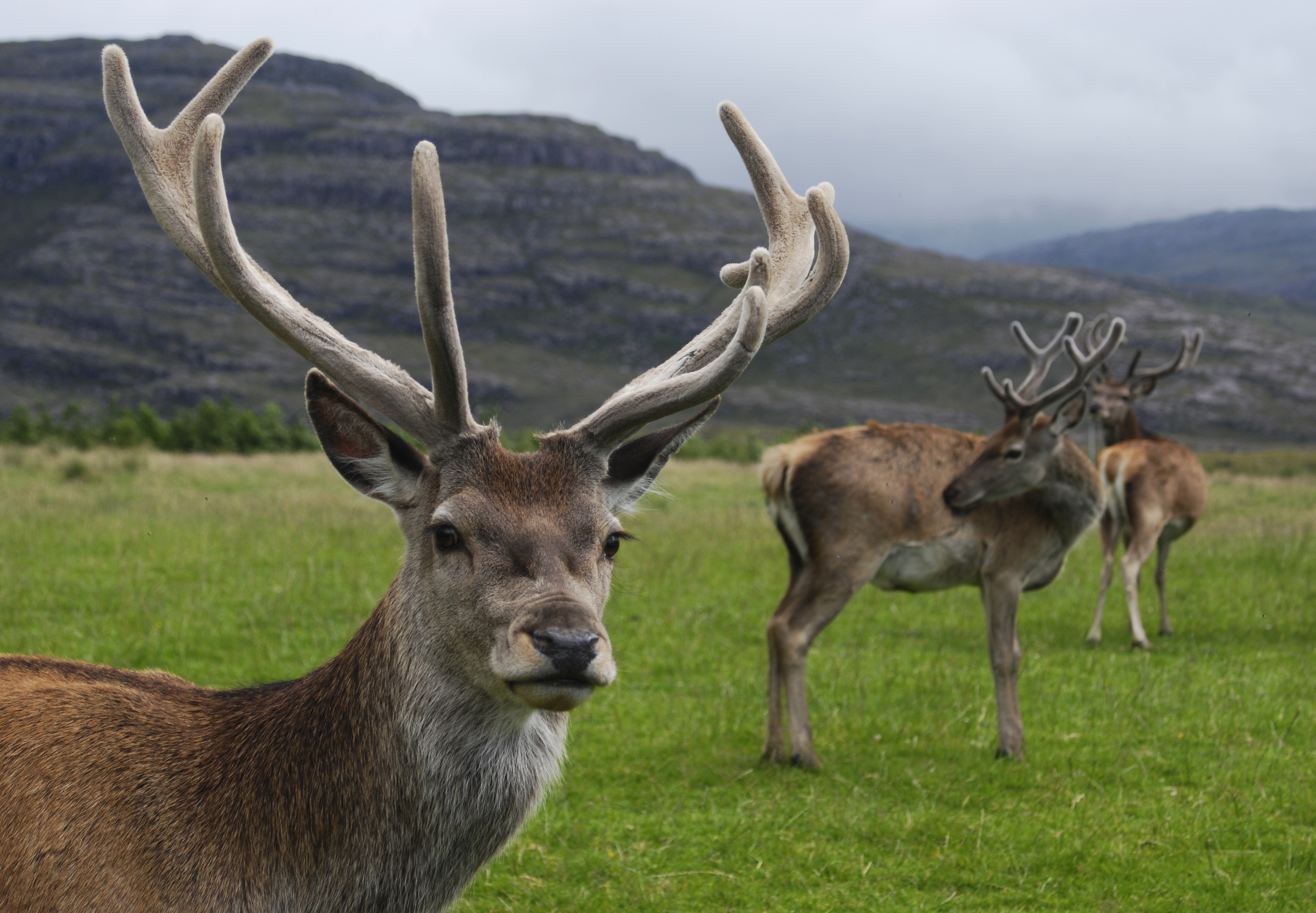
Red deer

The even-toed ungulates are ungulates whose weight is borne about equally by the third and fourth toes, rather than mostly or entirely by the third as in perissodactyls. There are about 220 artiodactyl species, including many that are of great economic importance to humans.

- Family: Cervidae (deer)
  - Subfamily: Capreolinae
    - Genus: Capreolus
      - Roe deer, C. capreolus LC
  - Subfamily: Cervinae
    - Genus: Axis
      - Chital, A. axis LC introduced
    - Genus: Cervus
      - Red deer, C. elaphus LC
    - Genus: Dama
      - European fallow deer, D. dama LC
- Family: Bovidae
  - Subfamily: Caprinae
    - Genus: Rupicapra
      - Northern chamois, R. rupicapra LC
- Family: Suidae (pigs)
  - Subfamily: Suinae
    - Genus: Sus
      - Wild boar, S. scrofa LC

== See also ==
- List of chordate orders
- Lists of mammals by region
- List of prehistoric mammals
- Mammal classification
- List of mammals described in the 2000s
