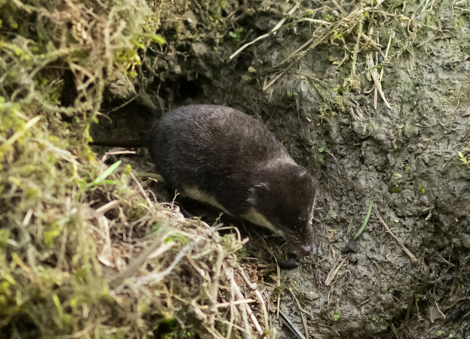

Conservation status
- Least Concern (IUCN 3.1)

Scientific classification
- Kingdom: Animalia
- Phylum: Chordata
- Class: Mammalia
- Order: Eulipotyphla
- Family: Soricidae
- Genus: Neomys
- Species: N. fodiens

Binomial name
- Neomys fodiens (Pennant, 1771)
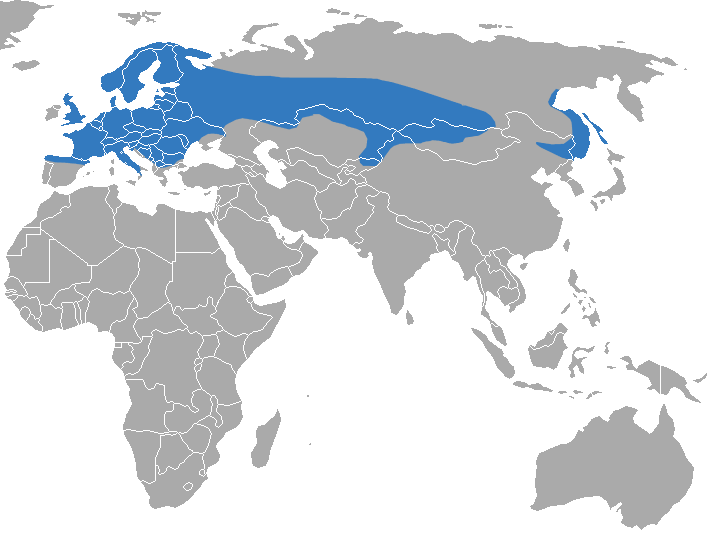
- Eurasian water shrew range

Synonyms
- Crossopus fodiens Pallas

= Eurasian water shrew =

Species of mammal

The Eurasian water shrew (Neomys fodiens), known in the United Kingdom as the water shrew, is a relatively large shrew, up to 10 cm (4 in) long, with a tail up to three-quarters as long again. It has short, dark fur, often with a few white tufts, a white belly, and a few stiff hairs around the feet and tail. It lives close to fresh water, hunting aquatic prey in the water and invertebrates nearby.

Like many shrews, the water shrew has venomous saliva, making it one of the few venomous mammals. It lives a solitary life and is found throughout the northern part of Europe and Asia, from Britain to Korea.

== Evolution ==
With genetic as well as morphological evidences, the speciation of N. fodiens from other species in genus Neomys seem to be earlier than the divergence between N. teres and N. anomalus, despite a large portion of geographic range of N. anomalus overlaps with N. fodiens. Another phylogenetic study also supports such claim with phylogenetic tree and associated split times between lineages. Subsequently, several hypotheses of the evolutionary history of the genus Neomys have been made. One of the hypotheses claims that the speciation between species N. fodiens, N. anomalus, and N. teres was heavily affected by climatic oscillations during the Pleistocene, in which N. fodiens expanded southwards during cold periods, but moved back northwards in the subsequent warm periods. As a result of geographic barriers, the isolated populations in Pontic Mountains speciated into N. teres while the population in the Balkan region become N. anomalus.

Its karyotype has 2n = 52 and FN = 98.

== Description ==
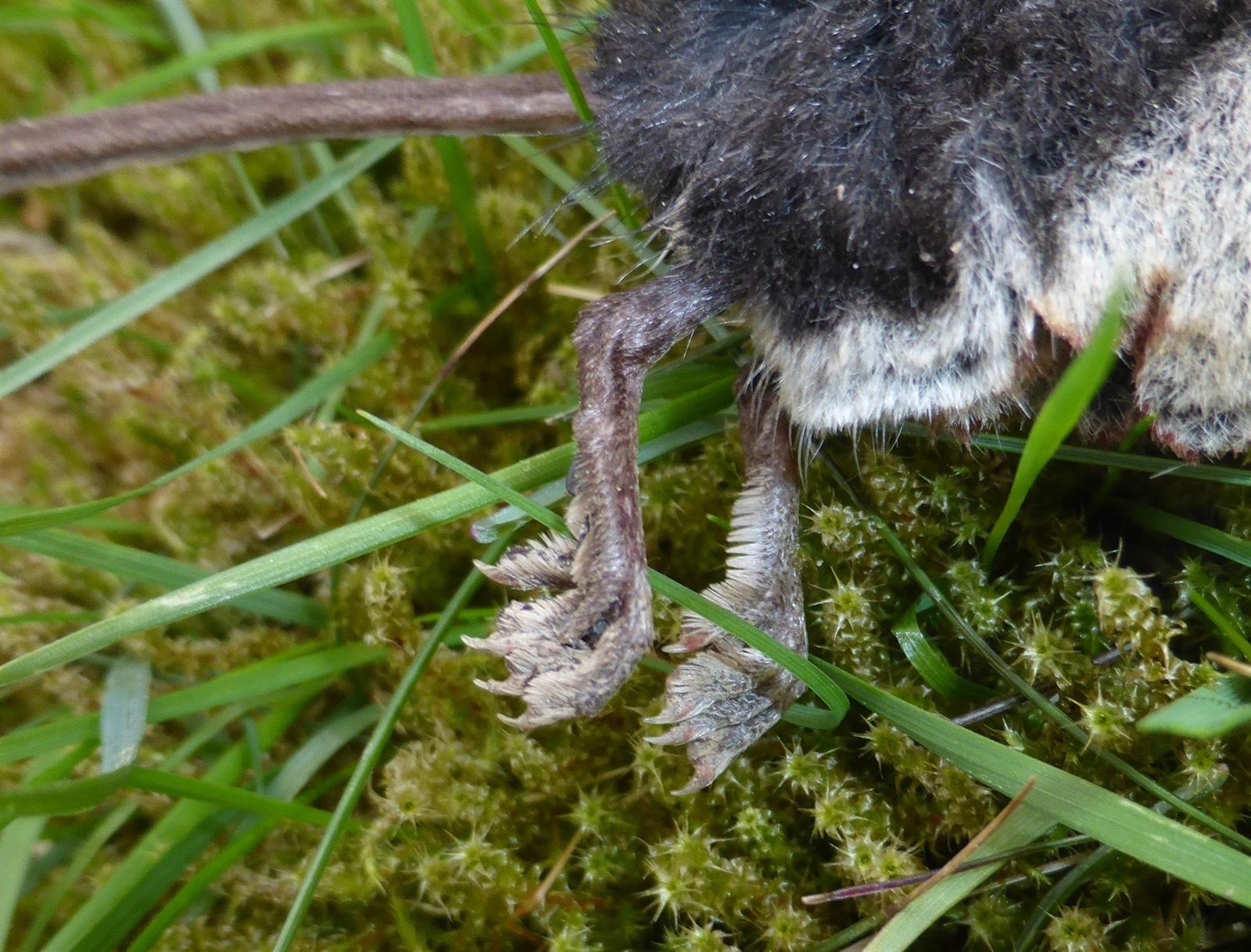
Hind limbs of Neomys fodiens

The Eurasian water shrew grows to a length of about 10 cm (4 in) long with a tail length of 8 cm (3 in) and weight of 15 to 19 grams (1/2 to 5/8 oz). The dense short fur on the head, back and sides is greyish-black. The underparts are dirty white and are sharply demarcated from the dorsal surface. Sometimes they are tinged with rusty brown or occasionally are entirely dark grey. There is a white spot just behind the eye and often another near the small, rounded ear which is nearly hidden in the fur. The nose is black and the snout long and tapering. The female has five pairs of nipples. The legs are short and the hind feet are powerful, with a fringe of short, stiff hairs on the outer edge, both of which features assist while it is driving its body through the water. The tail is slender and has a keel of short white hairs on the underside. This shrew often utters shrill cries as it scurries about. When wet their colouration becomes less distinct, with their white undersides less noticeable.

=== Teeth ===
The sharp, mostly white teeth are tipped with red, typical of the shrew subfamily Soricinae. The rusty colour comes from deposits of iron which serve to harden the enamel and which are concentrated in the tips of the teeth, particularly the molars which are the teeth most subject to wear. Like other shrews, N. fodiens has large and hooked first upper incisors. The species can by identified by its four unicuspid teeth and blade-like first lower incisors. Submaxillary glands at the base of the first lower incisors produce a neurotoxic venom and grooves along the incisors channel the venom when biting.

== Distribution and habitat ==
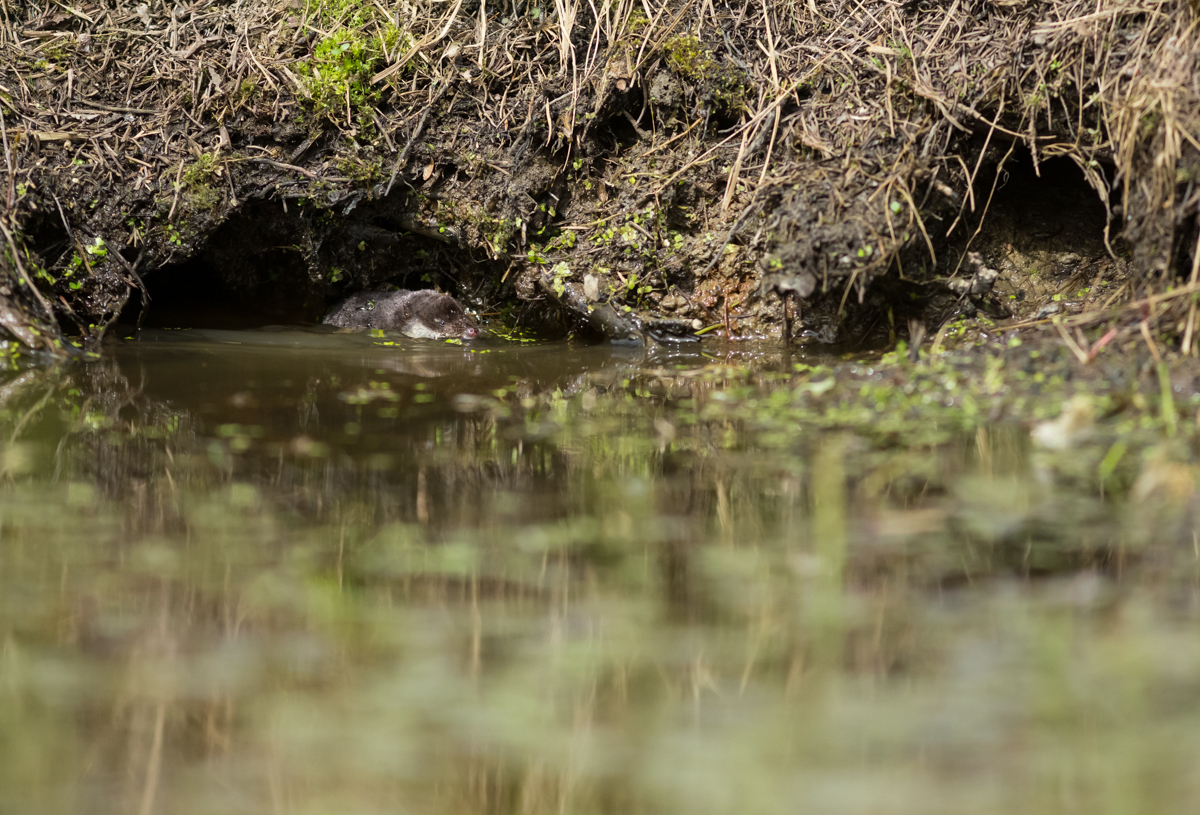
Neomys fodiens in its habitat

The Eurasian water shrew is found throughout Europe with the exception of Iceland, Ireland, certain Mediterranean islands and the Balkans. In Asia, its range extends from western Siberia and Asia Minor to North Korea and the Pacific coast of Siberia. It rarely strays far from water and is found in and around ditches, streams, ponds, watercress beds, fish ponds, damp meadows and rough bushy ground adjoining water.

== Behaviour ==
The Eurasian water shrew is most active near dawn and primarily nocturnal. It is thoroughly at home in the water and able to dive up to two meters underwater. This is despite its high buoyancy that requires it to leap to get below the surface. Its short fur holds air, and the skin does not get wet when it swims. When it emerges from the water it enters one of its many burrows and any moisture adhering to the fur is absorbed by the earth walls. It generally remains within a home range of about 500 square meters although this range changes periodically throughout the year. When foraging on land the Eurasian water shrew is known to travel up to 3 kilometers.

=== Reproduction ===
Outside the breeding season, both male and female Eurasian water shrews maintain a territory but during the breeding season, only the females do so. At this time the males wander about visiting various female territories which indicates a promiscuous mating system without pair bonding. On the whole they are solitary animals that seem to mutually avoid each other and there is no social hierarchy.

The breeding season extends from April to September and much of the courtship takes place in the water. It either uses pre-existing burrows or digs its own. The nesting chamber is lined with moss, dry grass and leaves. Litters of four to eight or more young are born after a twenty-four-day gestation period. The young are tiny and helpless at birth. Their eyes open at fifteen to eighteen days, they are fully weaned at about four weeks, and the young set off on their own after up to forty days. Females can produce one or two litters a year. They are sexually mature at six to eight months and their life expectancy is about three years.

== Ecology ==
The Eurasian water shrew mostly feeds on aquatic organisms which are caught while it is swimming. It can remain underwater for twenty seconds before it has to surface to breathe. When attacking prey, it will salivate profusely, producing its neurotoxic saliva which it attempts to deliver at the base of the skull. Even prey larger than the shrew can be subdued by the toxic secretions allowing it to fulfill its high metabolic needs. They feed on aquatic crustaceans, freshwater snails, other mollusks, small fish, aquatic larvae, aquatic insects, spiders, amphibians, especially frogs and newts, and small rodents are also eaten. It also feeds on land on invertebrates such as insect (dipteran) larvae, beetles, worms, and millipedes. According to a study, N. fodiens showed a higher consumption frequency of small invertebrates (larvae) compared to medium-sized earthworms and beetles. Additionally, medium-sized prey were consumed more gradually than small prey items (earthworms versus larvae and earthworms versus beetles).

The venom produced by the Eurasian water shrew has been shown to be potent against the field vole (Microtus agrestis), and lethal at a minimum dose of fifteen milligrams per kilogram body weight. The venom consists of a paralytic peptide which has been patented for use in neuromuscular therapy. Overall, the Eurasian water shrew venom has stronger paralytic properties and lower cardioinhibitory activity. Thus acting as an immobilizing agent towards their prey or to organisms that may threaten them.

Hantaviruses have also been detected in shrews in Hungary and Poland, raising public health concerns despite epidemiological mechanisms largely unknown.

== Conservation ==
The International Union for Conservation of Nature lists the Eurasian water shrew as being of "Least concern" in its Red List of Threatened Species. This is because it has a large population distributed across a wide range and its population seems fairly stable. In some areas habitat degradation is occurring and wetlands are being drained but not to such an extent as to increase the status to "Vulnerable". Other possible threats include agricultural products and sewage which may pollute waterways and reduce the availability of food. In western Spain, a separate subspecies (N. f. niethammeri) has a very limited range and may be declining in numbers.

Eurasian water shrews in alpine lakes are facing pressure from introduced fishes as they reduce the availablility of aquatic invertebrates--the major prey of the shrews. Climate change may pose threats on Eurasian water shrews such as a range shrift towards northern Europe or a severe habitat loss in continental Europe, depending on climate scenarios.
