= Iberian water shrew =

Conservation status
- Least Concern (IUCN 3.1)

Scientific classification
- Kingdom: Animalia
- Phylum: Chordata
- Class: Mammalia
- Order: Eulipotyphla
- Family: Soricidae
- Genus: Neomys
- Species: N. anomalus

Binomial name
- Neomys anomalus Cabrera, 1907

Species of mammal

The Iberian water shrew (Neomys anomalus) is a species of mammal in the insectivore family Soricidae.

== Distribution ==
The Iberian water shrew is found in France, Portugal, and Spain.

Neomys anomalus was previously used in a broader sense for the Mediterranean water shrew, which had two subspecies: Neomys anomalus anomalus in the Iberian peninsula and Neomys anomalus millerii with a wide distribution from western Europe to southwest Asia. Following a phylogenetic analysis, the two subspecies were recognised as distinct species, Neomys anomalus for the Iberian species and Neomys milleri for the more widely distributed species. The conservation assessment of the broadly defined species (Southern water shrew) for The IUCN Red List of Threatened Species in 2021 gave a conservation status of Least Concern, and the Iberian water shrew was assessed separately in 2024.

== Feeding habits ==
It feeds mainly on amphibians and small fish, but also take insects and worms. Because of its small size and thus higher surface area to volume ratio, it loses body heat more quickly and must eat two or three times its body mass each day.
