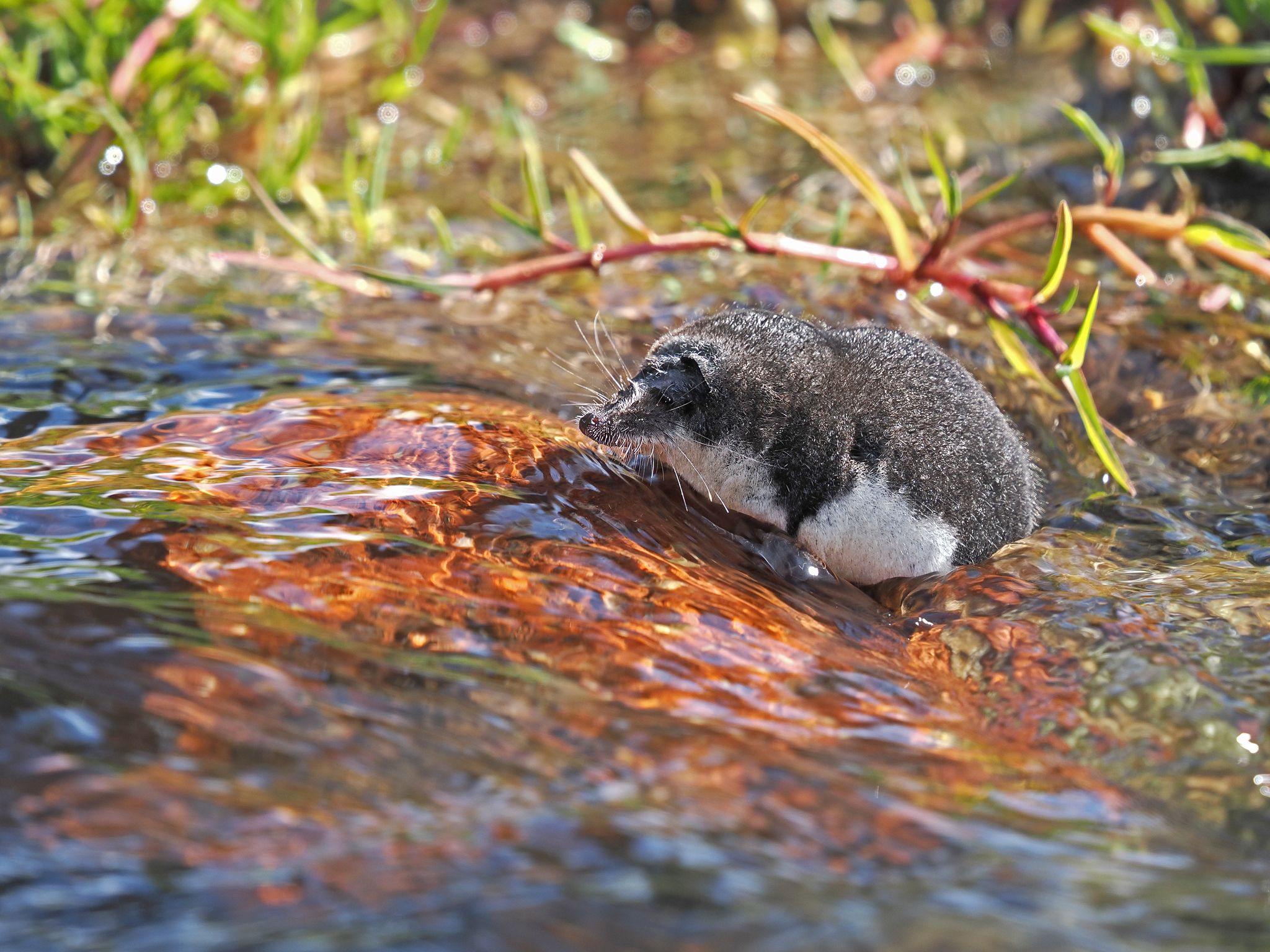

Conservation status
- Least Concern (IUCN 3.1)

Scientific classification
- Kingdom: Animalia
- Phylum: Chordata
- Class: Mammalia
- Order: Eulipotyphla
- Family: Soricidae
- Genus: Neomys
- Species: N. teres

Binomial name
- Neomys teres Miller, 1908
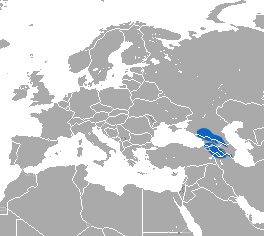
- Transcaucasian water shrew range

= Transcaucasian water shrew =

Species of mammal

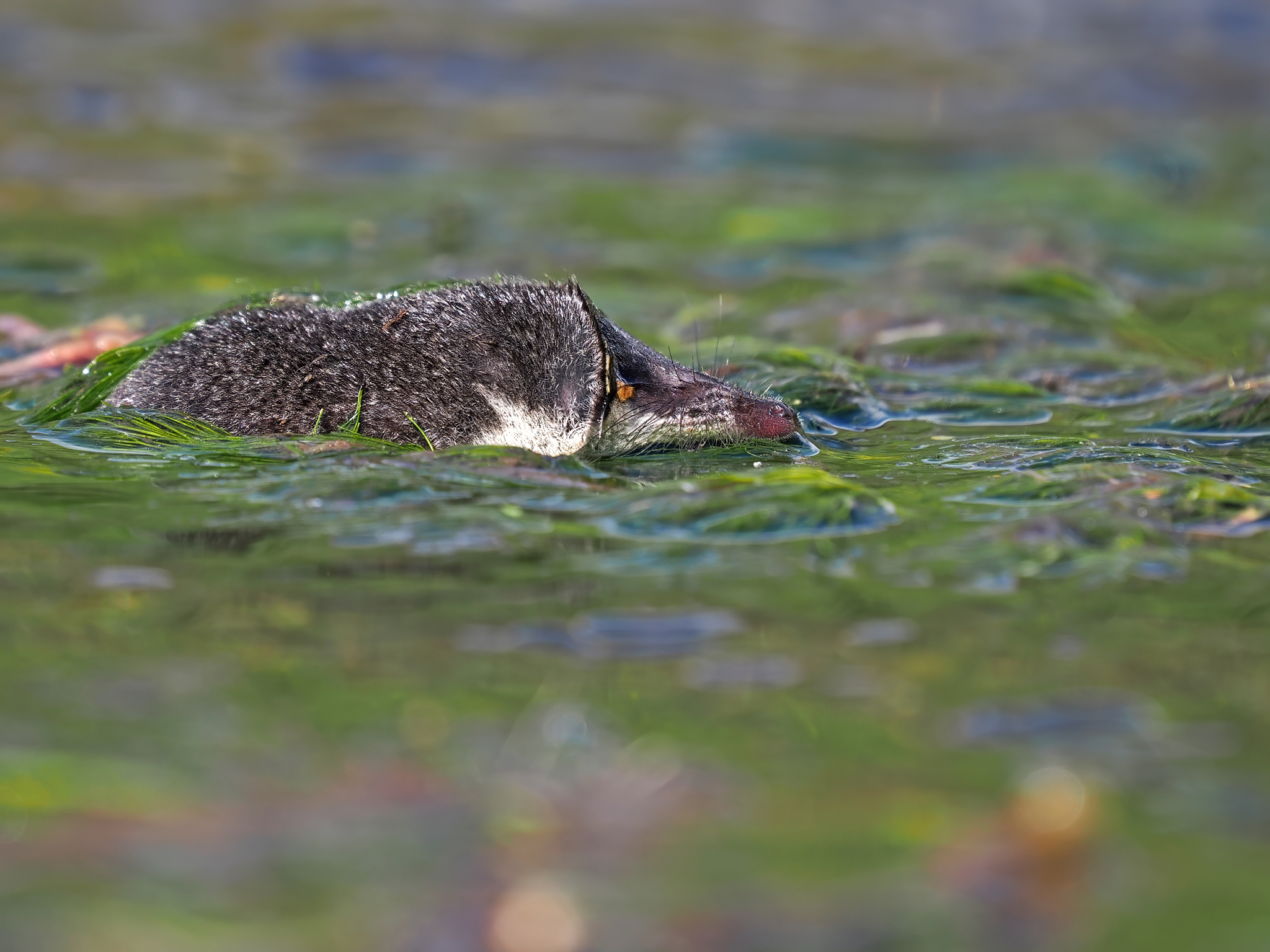
Swimming Transcaucasian water shrew

The Transcaucasian water shrew (Neomys teres) is a species of mammal in the family Soricidae. It is found in Armenia, Azerbaijan, Georgia, and possibly Iran and Turkey.
