= Paralytic peptides =

Type of Insect peptide

GBP_PSP
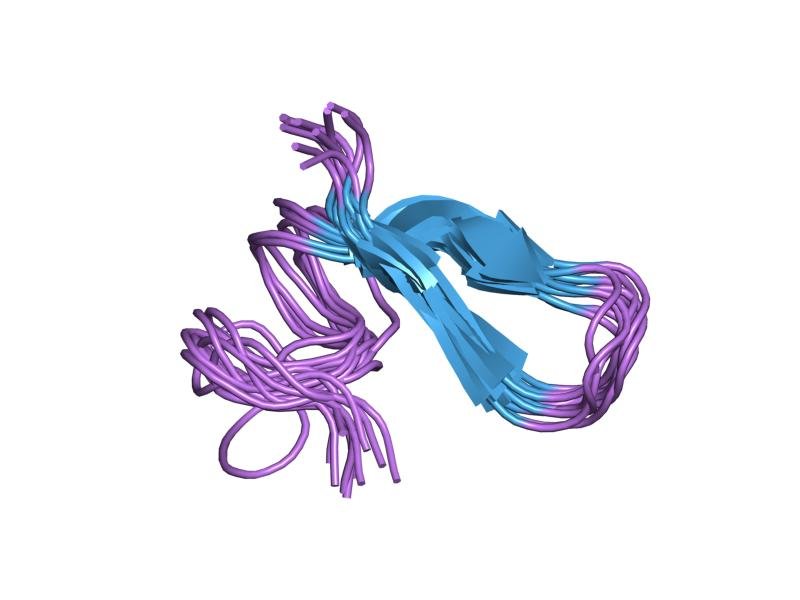
- Structure of a paralytic peptide from an insect, Manduca sexta

Identifiers
- Symbol: GBP_PSP
- Pfam: PF02425
- InterPro: IPR003463
- SCOP2: 1b1v / SCOPe / SUPFAM
- OPM superfamily: 156
- OPM protein: 2eqt
Available protein structures:
- PDB: IPR003463 PF02425 (ECOD; PDBsum)
- AlphaFold: IPR003463; PF02425

Paralytic peptides are a family of short (23 amino acids) insect peptides that halt metamorphosis of insects from larvae to pupae. These peptides contain one disulphide bridge. The family includes growth-blocking peptide (GBP) of Mythimna separata (Oriental armyworm) and the paralytic peptides from Manduca sexta (tobacco hawkmoth), Heliothis virescens (noctuid moth), and Spodoptera exigua (beet armyworm) as well as plasmatocyte-spreading peptide (PSP1).
