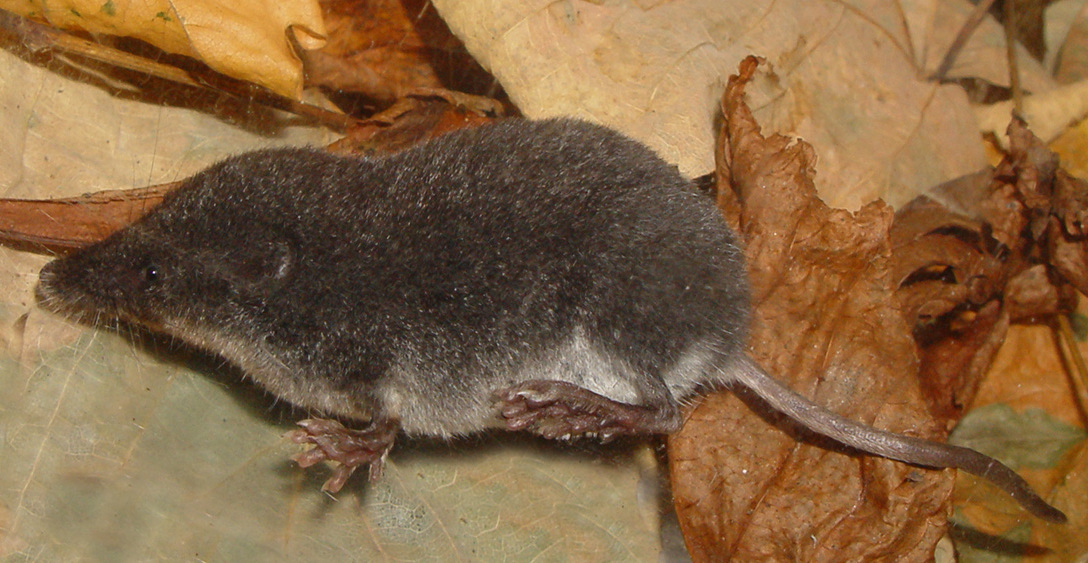

Conservation status
- Least Concern (IUCN 3.1)

Scientific classification
- Kingdom: Animalia
- Phylum: Chordata
- Class: Mammalia
- Order: Eulipotyphla
- Family: Soricidae
- Genus: Neomys
- Species: N. milleri

Binomial name
- Neomys milleri Mottaz, 1907
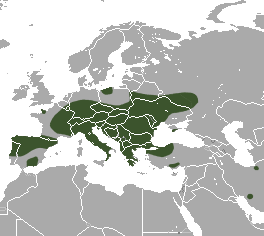
- Mediterranean water shrew range. The shrews in the Iberian peninsula are now recognised as a separate species, Neomys anomalus.

Synonyms
- Neomys anomalus milleri

= Mediterranean water shrew =

Species of mammal

The Mediterranean, Southern or Miller's water shrew (Neomys milleri) is a species of insectivoran mammal in the family Soricidae.

== Distribution ==
The shrew is found in Albania, Austria, Belgium, Bosnia and Herzegovina, Bulgaria, Croatia, Czech Republic, France, Germany, Greece, Hungary, Iran, Italy, Liechtenstein, Lithuania, Montenegro, North Macedonia, Poland, Romania, Russia, Serbia, Slovakia, Slovenia, Switzerland, Turkey, and Ukraine. This species was formerly a subspecies of Neomys anomalus along with the Iberian water shrew found in Spain, Portugal and southern France.

== Feeding habits ==
It feeds mainly on amphibians and small fish, but also take insects and worms. Because of its small size and thus higher surface area to volume ratio, it loses body heat more quickly and must eat two or three times its body mass each day.
