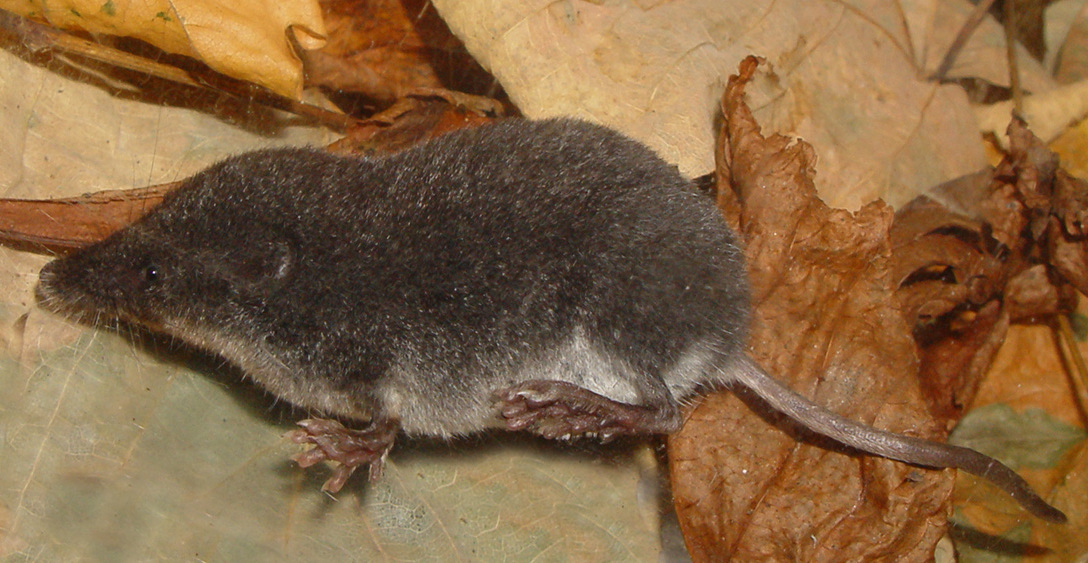
- Mediterranean water shrew (Neomys anomalus)

Scientific classification
- Domain: Eukaryota
- Kingdom: Animalia
- Phylum: Chordata
- Class: Mammalia
- Order: Eulipotyphla
- Family: Soricidae
- Tribe: Nectogalini
- Genus: Neomys; Kaup, 1829

Type species
- Sorex fodiens (Pennant, 1771)

Species
- N. milleri; N. fodiens; N. anomalus; N. teres

= Neomys =

Neomys Temporal range: Pliocene to Recent

Genus of mammals

The genus Neomys is a group of four Eurasian water shrews from the subfamily Soricinae of the family Soricidae. These shrews are found in most of Europe and parts of northern Asia, as well as Turkey and Iran. Its member species are:

- Eurasian water shrew (Neomys fodiens) — (Pennant, 1771)
- Iberian water shrew (Neomys anomalus) — Cabrera, 1907
- Mediterranean water shrew (Neomys milleri) — Mottaz, 1907
- Transcaucasian water shrew (Neomys teres) — Miller, 1908
